= University of Minnesota Old Campus Historic District =

Historic district in Minnesota, United States

Coordinates: 44°58′42″N 93°14′12″W

- U.S. National Register of Historic Places
- U.S. Historic district
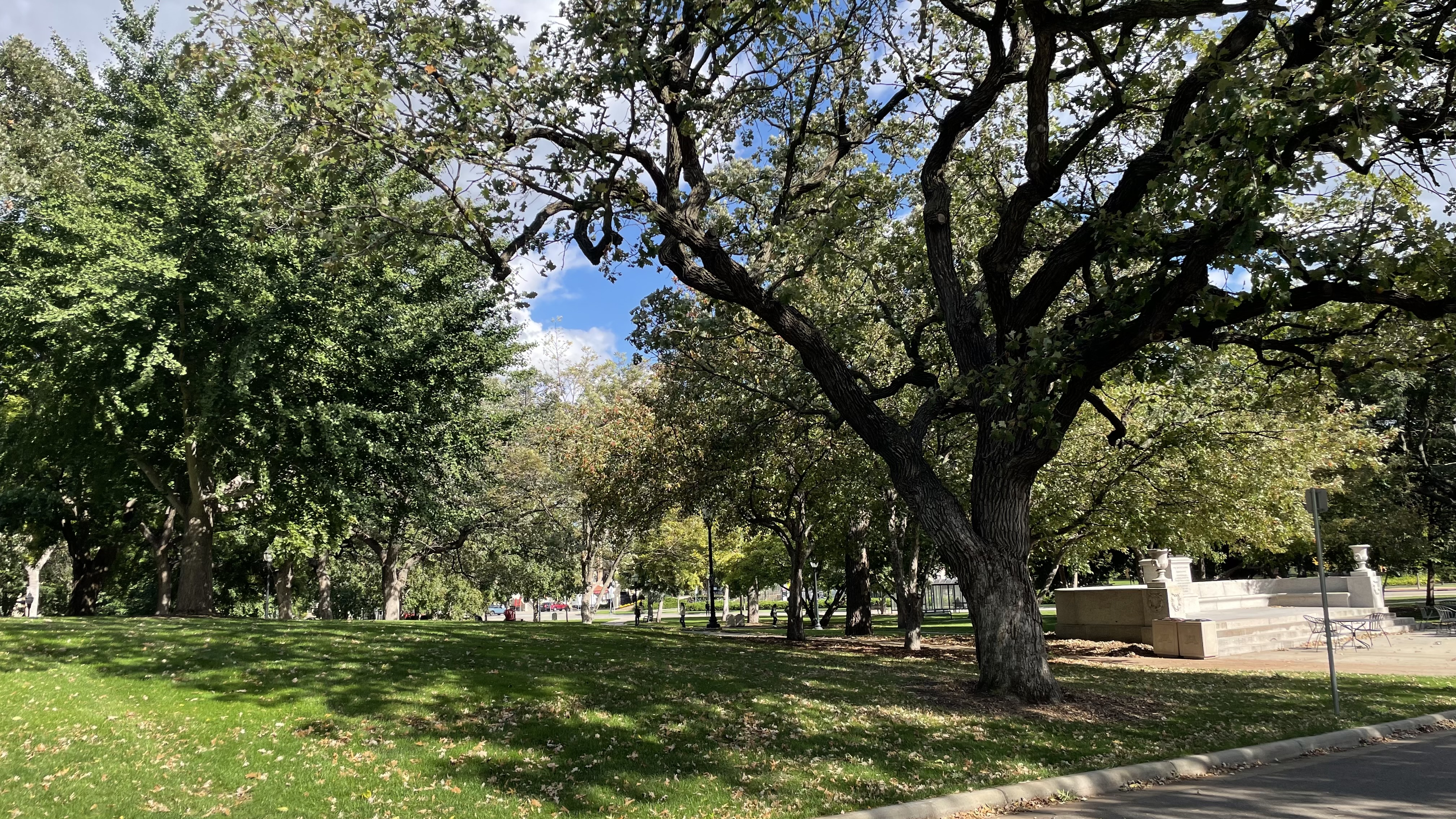
- The Knoll, an urban green space within the Old Campus Historic District, in 2023

- Location within Minnesota Location within the United States
- Location: University of Minnesota, Minneapolis, Minnesota
- Built: 1886-1907
- Architect: LeRoy S. Buffington, Harvey Ellis, J. Walter Stevens, Reed and Stem, Charles Ronald Aldrich, Clarence H. Johnston, Horace Cleveland, et al
- Architectural style: Richardsonian Romanesque, Greek Revival, Queen Anne, Beaux-Arts, Jacobethan Revival, Victorian, Renaissance Revival
- NRHP reference No.: 84001463
- Added to NRHP: August 23, 1984

The University of Minnesota Old Campus Historic District is a historic district located in Minneapolis, Minnesota. Listed in the National Register of Historic Places since 1984, it includes a number of historic buildings that were constructed during the late 1800s and early 1900s, and represents the oldest extant section of the University of Minnesota campus. The general area was designed by landscape architect Horace W. S. Cleveland, who envisioned a park-like University. His plan, that he presented to the Board of Regents, went on to help form the Historic District. It is located directly to the north of the university's Northrop Mall Historic District.

== Eddy Hall, 1886 ==
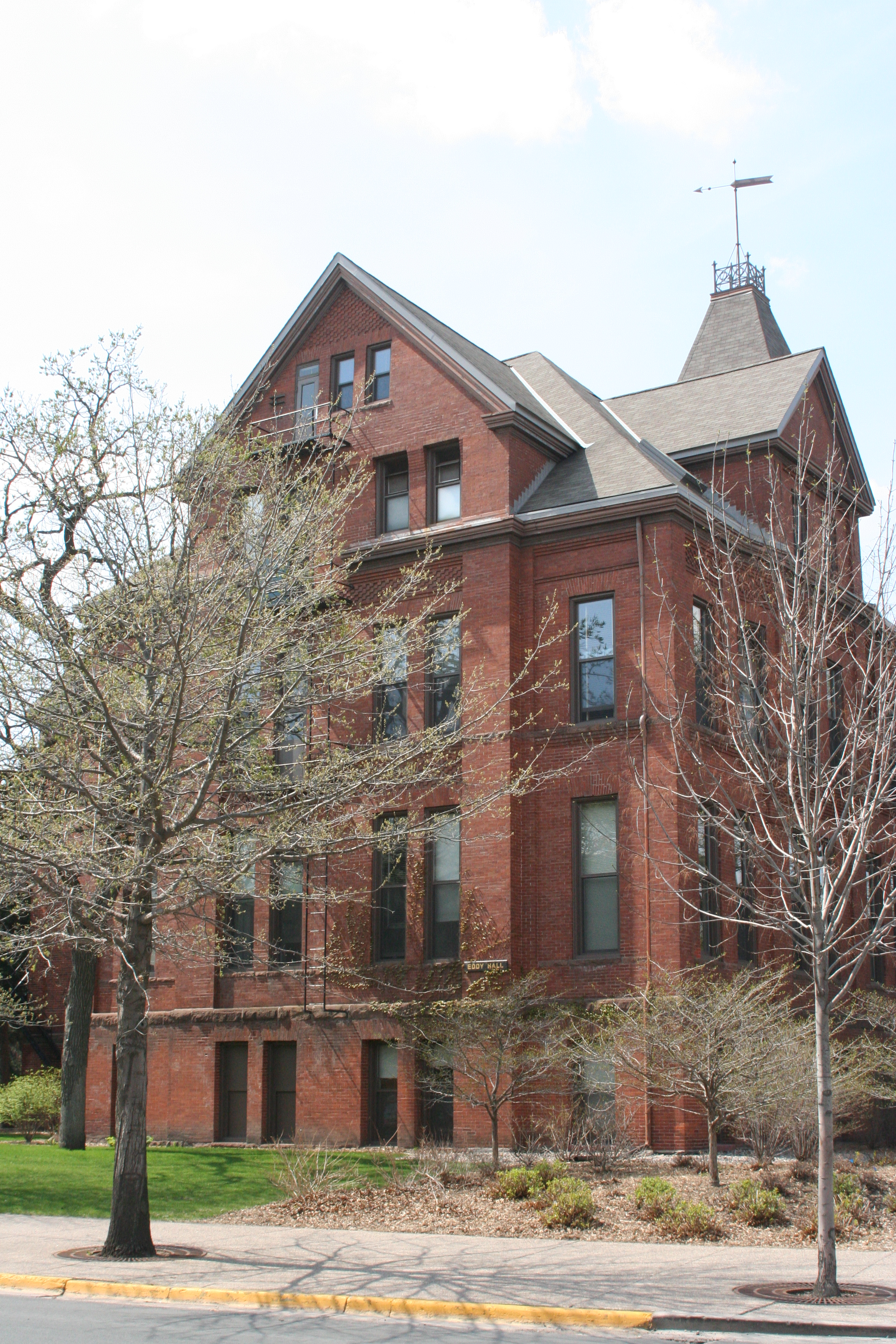
Eddy Hall in 2005

Architect: LeRoy Buffington

Eddy Hall is the oldest building within the district, as well as the oldest extant building on the Minneapolis campus. Originally built as the Mechanic Arts building, it was designed by Minneapolis architect LeRoy S. Buffington. Executed in the Queen Anne mode, the building is three stories in height on a high basement; a square tower at the northwest corner dominates the entry. It is constructed of red brick with red sandstone trim, and is essentially rectangular in plan. Dominant features include the multi-gabled roof, high double-hung windows, panels of patterned brick, and iron cresting with weather vane on the tower.

Erected at a cost of $30,000 in 1886, the building received a $10,000 addition in 1903. The building originally housed the Mathematics, Drawing, Civil-Municipal-Structural Engineering departments, as well as testing laboratories. The Mechanic Arts building was eventually renamed Eddy Hall in honor of Henry Turner Eddy, former professor of Engineering and Mathematics and later Dean of the Graduate School. In 2011, it closed its doors anticipating a renovation to fix several issues. The building was in a state of disrepair; the top floor was roped off due to structural concerns, and the annex already had to be demolished. The university asked the state for $21,000,000 in funding, however, a bonding bill proposed by then governor Mark Dayton did not include money allocated for the project. The renovation was snubbed and Eddy Hall has remained vacant since.

== Music Education, 1888 (demolished 2010) ==
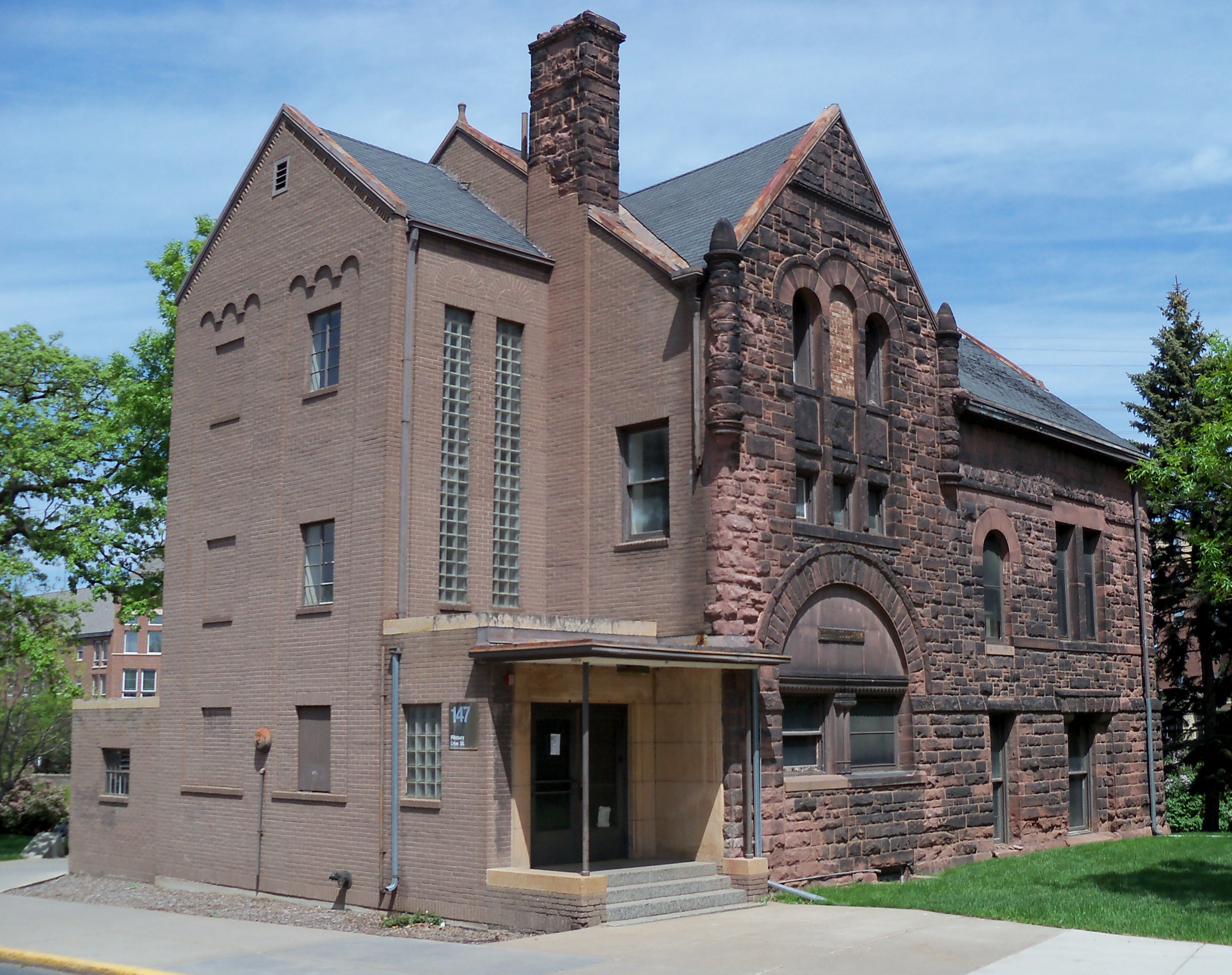
The Music Education building in 2010

Architect: Warren H. Hayes

Originally the Student Christian Association building. It once housed the Child Welfare and Music Education departments. In the 1940s, an expanded entryway was added. On July 8, 2009, as part of an effort to raze obsolete buildings on campus, the University of Minnesota Board of Regents moved to demolish the building. According to the Regents, the excessive cost of renovation was the main deterrent against any reuse option. Demolition commenced in May 2010 with an expected cost of $432,000.

== Pillsbury Hall, 1889 ==
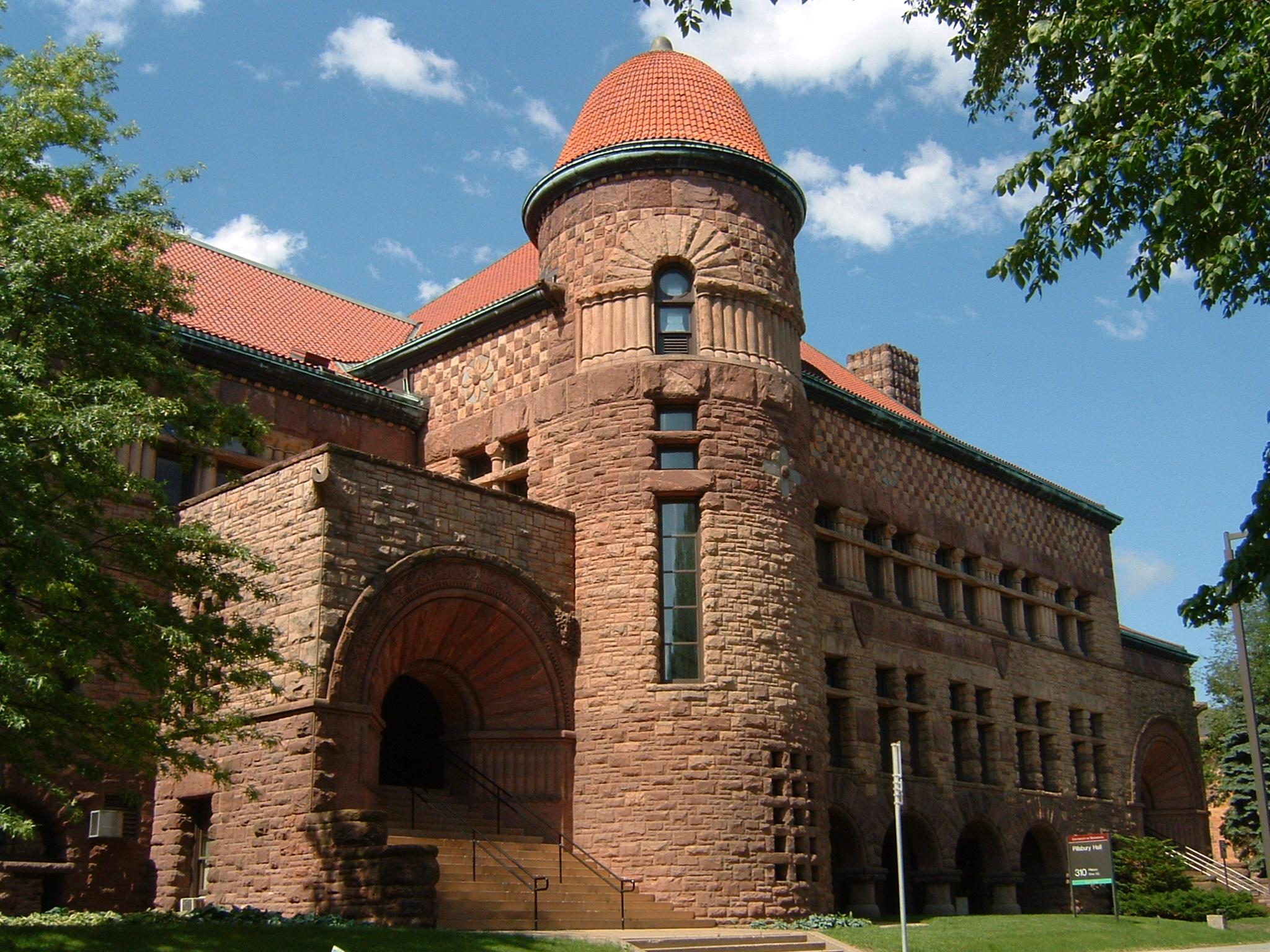
Pillsbury Hall in 2005

Architects: LeRoy Buffington with Harvey Ellis

Originally known as Science Hall, it was renamed in honor of Governor John S. Pillsbury during construction. Harvey Ellis, Buffington's assistant, was responsible for the Richardsonian Romanesque details of the design. Though Ellis was inspired by the aesthetic of Henry Hobson Richardson, the building also contains elements of the Prairie School, Arts and Crafts, Gothic, and Victorian styles. The building is built with two different colors of sandstone. The buff-colored sandstone is from quarries near Banning State Park, while the red sandstone is from the Fond du Lac formation. The clay tile roof and copper eaves serve to protect the sandstone from the infiltration of water, and they also add to the appearance of the building. Reflecting its earthen architectural elements, the building housed the Newton Horace Winchell School of Earth Sciences until 2017. The building underwent a renovation and reopened in 2022, now home to the university's English department.

== Pattee Hall, 1889 ==
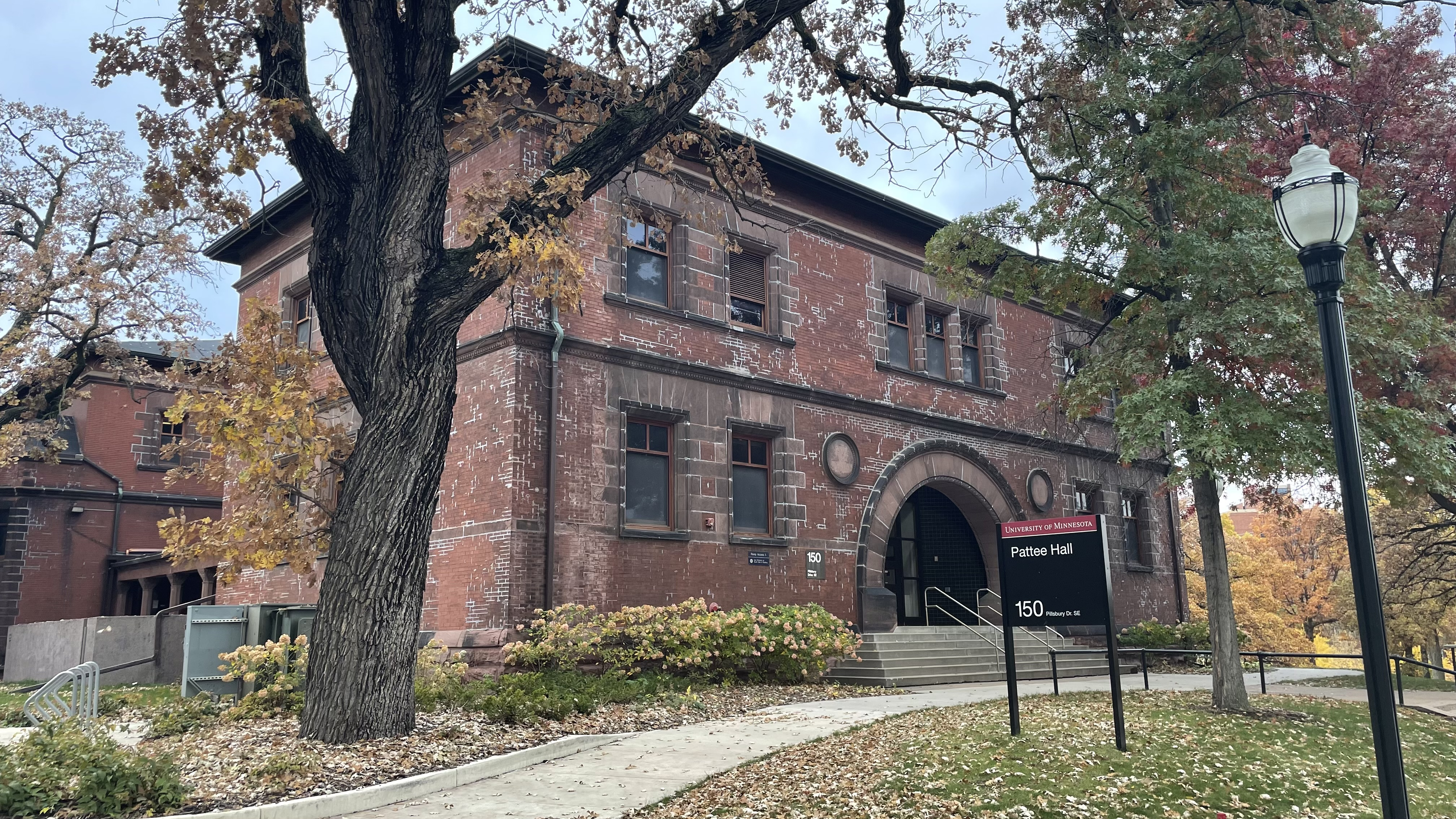
Pattee Hall in 2023

Architect: J. Walter Stevens

Originally known as the Law Building and erected at a cost of $30,000, it was the first building of the University of Minnesota Law School, which had been founded in 1888. The Richardsonian Romanesque-style building was later named after William S. Pattee, the School's first dean, and doubled in capacity from a 1905 expansion. In 1921, the School's dean, Everett Fraser complained that the classrooms were inadequate and that the library space was too flammable, as seen with the prior burning of Old Main in 1904. The Law School then moved to the newly built Fraser Hall in 1928, and later to Mondale Hall. Pattee Hall was left empty until 1947, when it became the home to the University Elementary School, until its departure in 1965, leaving the building vacant once again. The Institute on Community Integration occupied the building from 1985 until they outgrew the building in 2021 and moved into the Masonic Institute for Brain Development on the St. Paul campus. The Department of American Indian Studies moved into Pattee Hall in the fall of 2024 following a refresh of the building. Various symbols of the Law School still exist throughout the structure.

== 216 Pillsbury Drive, 1890 ==
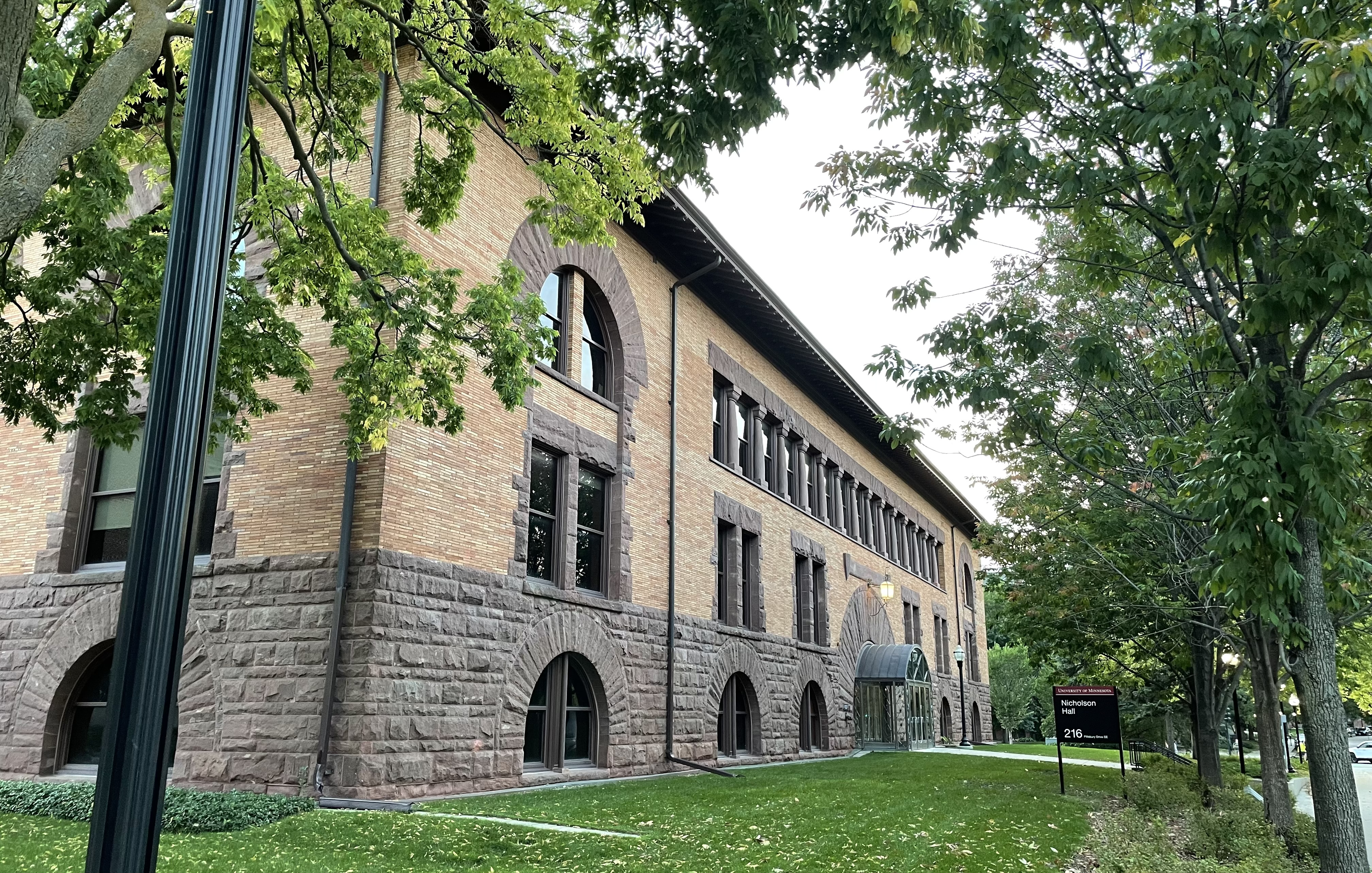
216 Pillsbury Drive in 2023

Architects: LeRoy Buffington with Harvey Ellis

Originally built as a chemistry laboratory, until the department moved. In 1914, the building was converted into a gathering space for the men's student union, containing game rooms, a smoking room, and billiards rooms; overall being modeled after gentlemen's clubs. The student union left when Coffman Memorial Union opened in 1940, and the building was later renamed to Nicholson Hall, after Edward E. Nicholson, the Dean of Student Affairs from 1917 to 1941.

The building was rehabilitated with $24 million of structural improvements and interior updates. While much of the building's Richardsonian Romanesque exterior was restored during the project, new Art Nouveau motifs were introduced throughout the interior. The building reopened to the public in January 2006 and is currently used for a number of classroom and administrative purposes, alongside housing the university’s Cultural Studies & Comparative Literature Department and the Center for Jewish Studies.

In 2019, a university task force suggested removing Edward E. Nicholson's name from the building, due to his anti-Semitic beliefs, along with his efforts to suppress political speech and student activism. In 2024, the name "Nicholson Hall" ceased use, with the building now known by its address, 216 Pillsbury Drive, until a new name is selected.

== Wulling Hall, 1892 ==
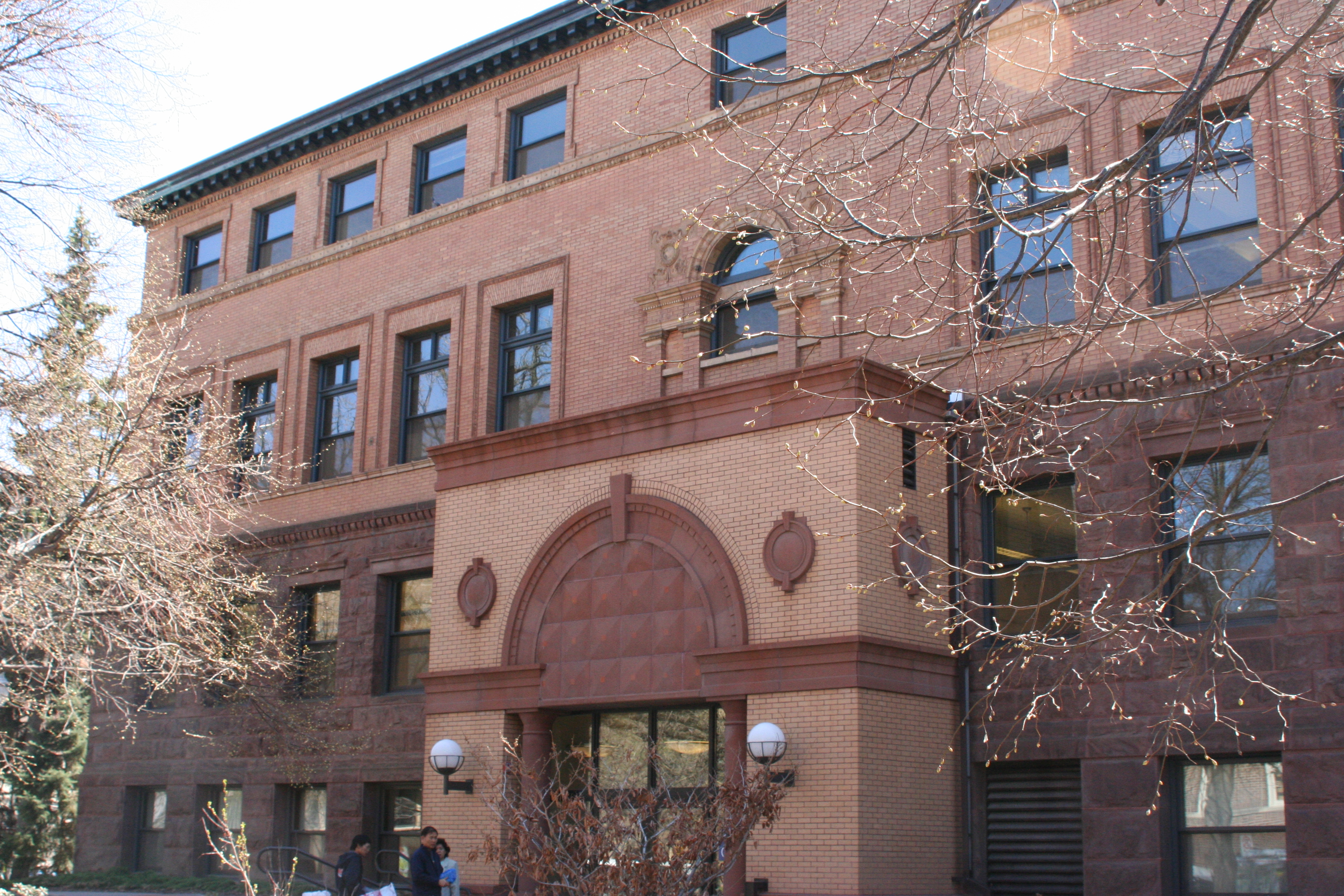
Wulling Hall in 2005

Architects: Allen Stem and Charles Reed

Originally built as Medical Hall, it contained the university's Medical School. In 1906, it was renamed as Millard Hall after the Medical School's first dean, Perry Millard, who died the same year. In 1912, the Medical School relocated and the College of Pharmacy took its place the next year. The building became known as Pharmacy Hall until being officially renamed as Wulling Hall in 1942, after the college's first dean, Frederick J. Wulling. The College of Pharmacy moved to Appleby Hall in 1960. Today, Wulling Hall houses some offices belonging to the College of Education and Human Development, as well as the university's new Center for Sales & Leadership Education.

== Burton Hall, 1894 ==
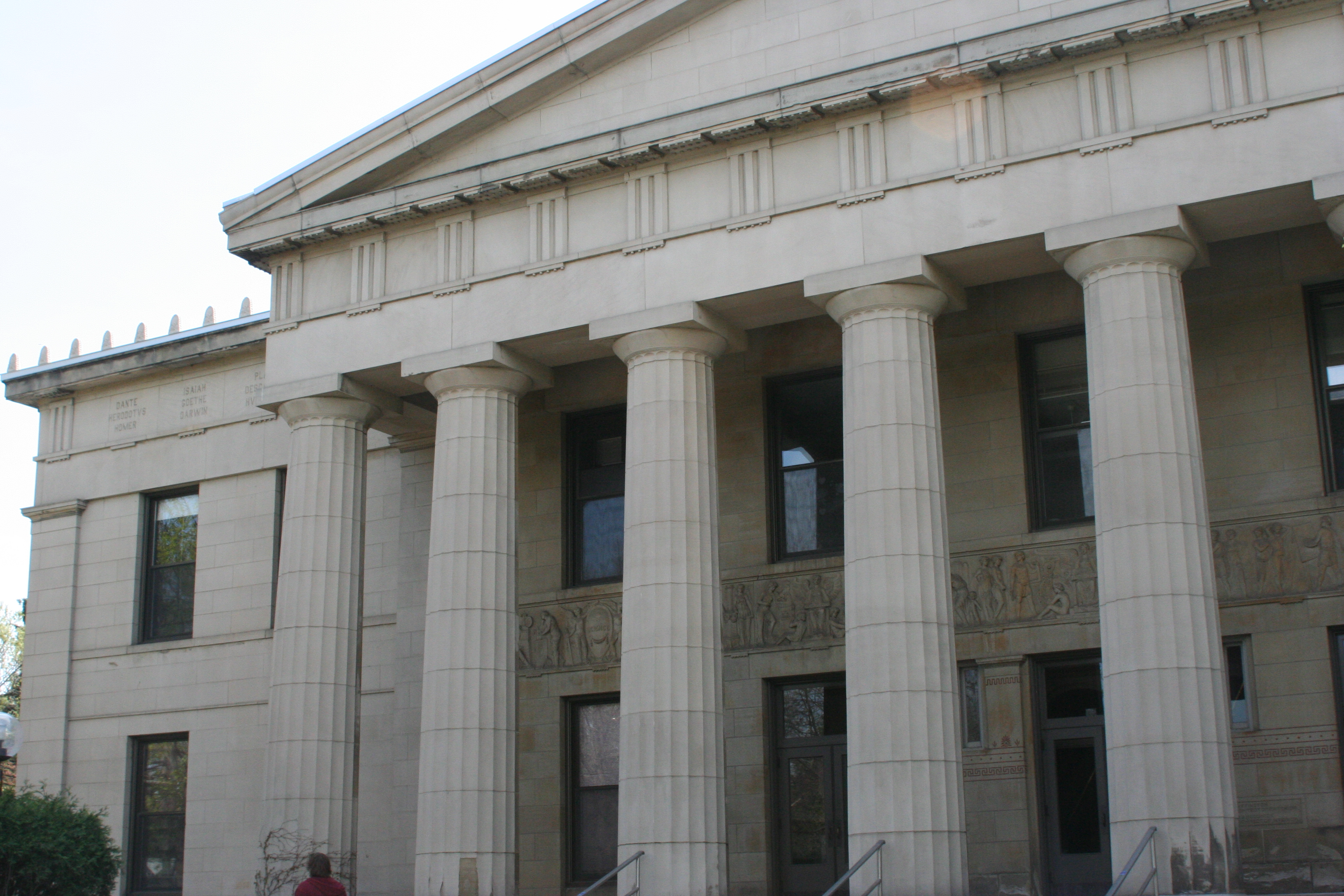
Burton Hall in 2005

Architects: LeRoy Buffington and Charles Sumner Sedgwick

Named in honor of university president Miriam Burton, it was the main library building on campus until Walter Library opened in 1924. Before Burton Hall was built, the library collection was housed in Old Main. A series of fires in Old Main convinced the Board of Regents that a new, fireproof building was needed. President William Watts Folwell first consulted with LeRoy Buffington on a library design, but the Regents overruled him. After much debate between the Regents and the faculty, the design was eventually finalized. In an act of compromise, the exterior was designed by Buffington in a severe Greek Revival style and the interior was designed by Charles Sedgwick in a rather ornate Victorian style. The building originally included an assembly hall which doubled as a chapel. It is currently home to the College of Education and Human Development.

== Armory, 1896 ==
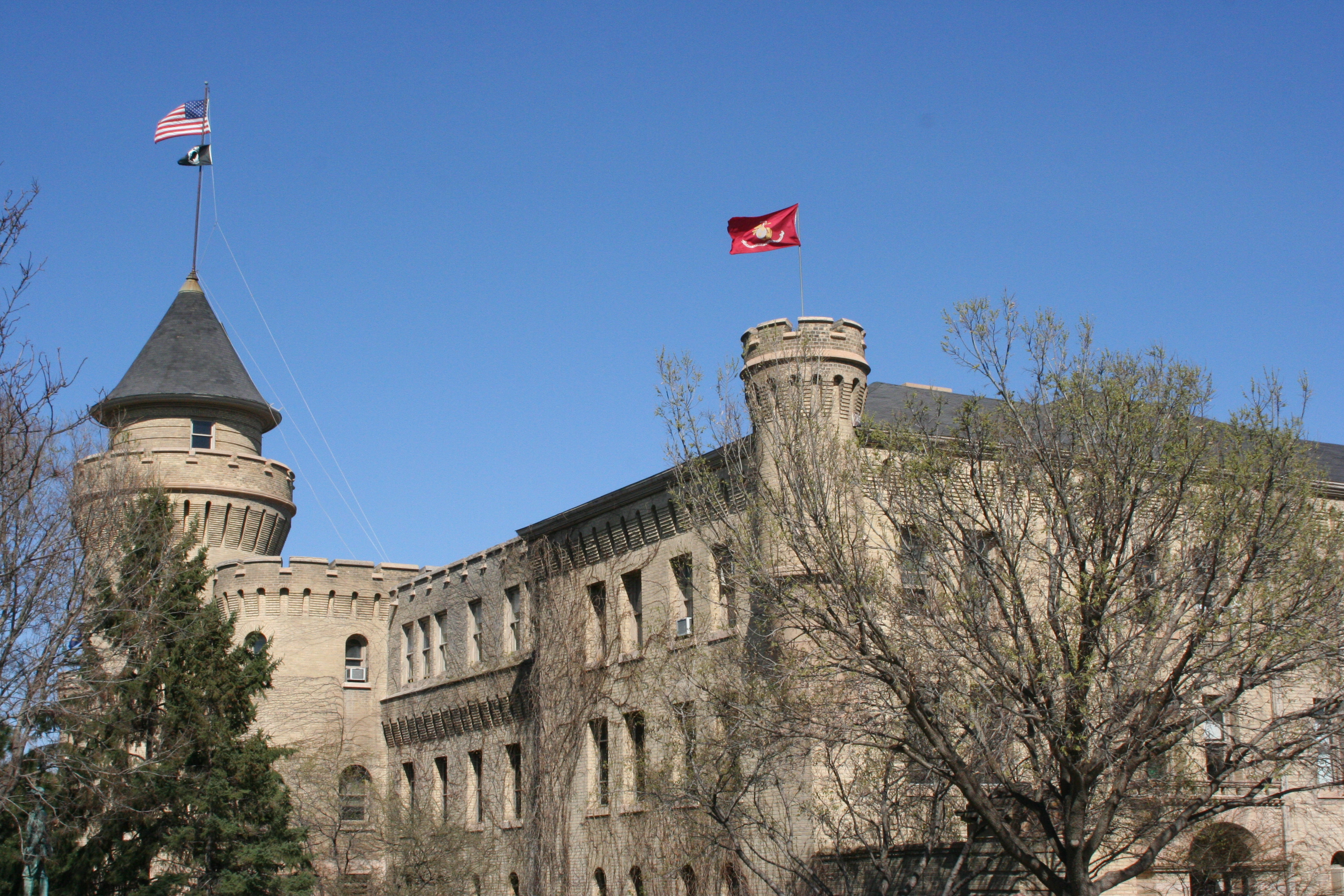
The Armory in 2005

Architect: Charles Ronald Aldrich

Originally built for athletics and military drills, it replaced the university's old Coliseum building. When it was constructed, it was the largest building at the university. It acted as a training site during World War I and later World War II, and is now home to the university's ROTC program. The Armory also played a part in the football rivalry between the University of Minnesota and the University of Michigan, as the latter's team left a water jug in the building after a game in 1903, initiating a tradition in which the two schools play for the Little Brown Jug (which in actuality is neither little nor brown) each year.

== Wesbrook Hall, 1898 (demolished 2011) ==
Wesbrook Hall in 2008

Architect: Frederick Corser

Originally the Laboratory of Medical Science and built in the Renaissance Revival style, at the cost of $65,000. It became the home of the Dentistry department in 1912, later housing the Department of Writing Studies and Student Veteran's Association. The building was renamed Wesbrook Hall after Frank Wesbrook, a professor in pathology and bacteriology and dean of the College of Medicine and Surgery. The building was demolished in August 2011 as part of the effort to get rid of buildings considered obsolete. University officials claimed the building would've been too costly to renovate and that it crowded the nearby Northrop Auditorium. The site is now the location of Pfutzenreuter Plaza, named after Richard Pfutzenreuter, a longtime treasurer at the university.

== Jones Hall, 1901 ==
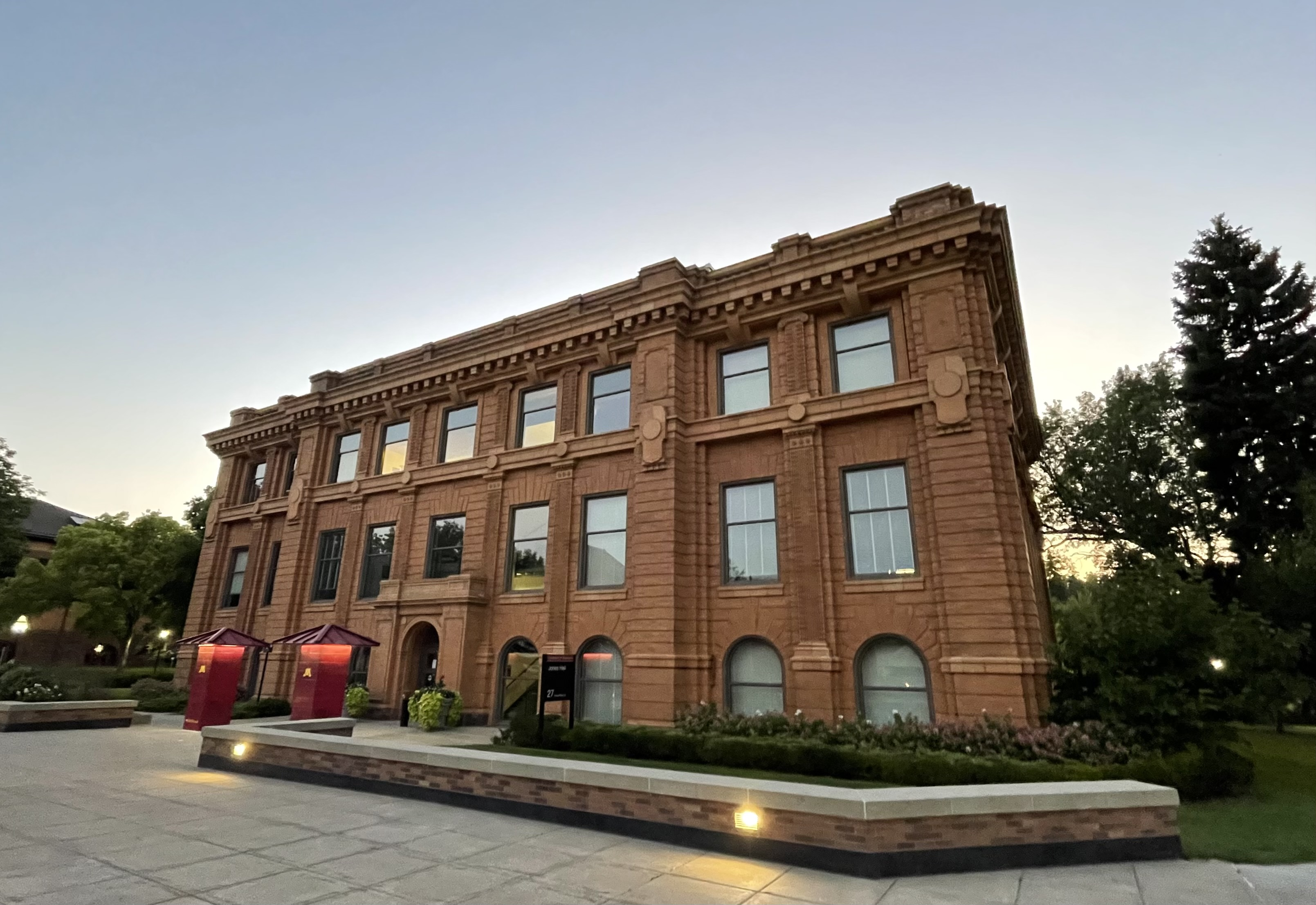
Jones Hall in 2023

Architect: Charles Ronald Aldrich

The first home of the Physics department. The Beaux-Arts structure was rehabilitated in 2005 to provide updated mechanical systems and ADA access. Historic features such as stair treads and banisters, paneled doors, arched ceilings, and terra cotta facade were preserved during the project. The building is now home to the Freshman Admissions Welcome Center as well as the College of Liberal Arts language lab.

== Campbell Hall, 1903 ==
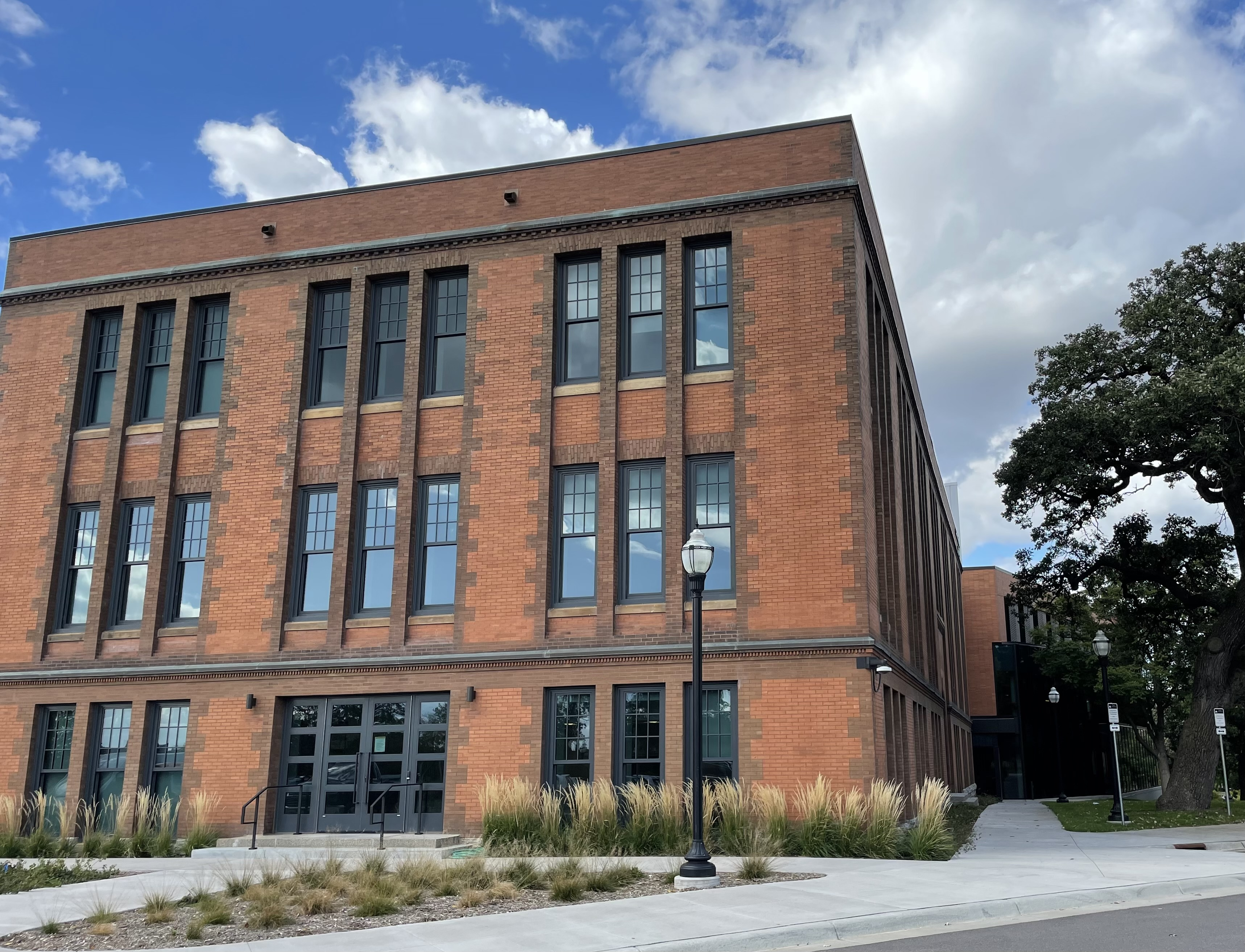
Campbell Hall in 2023

Architect: Clarence H. Johnston Sr.

Originally built as the School of Mines Building until damaged by fire in 1913. The building was later used for the University High School until its relocation to Peik Hall, and ultimately became the home of the Institute of Child Development. In 2020, a $42,000,000 grant for an addition and renovation was approved by the state, covering two thirds the cost of the project, with the rest being funded by donors. Construction began the same year. Until 2022, it was known as the Child Development Building before being officially named Campbell Hall upon completion of the building's renovation, after Carmen D. and James R. Campbell.

== Shevlin Hall, 1906 ==
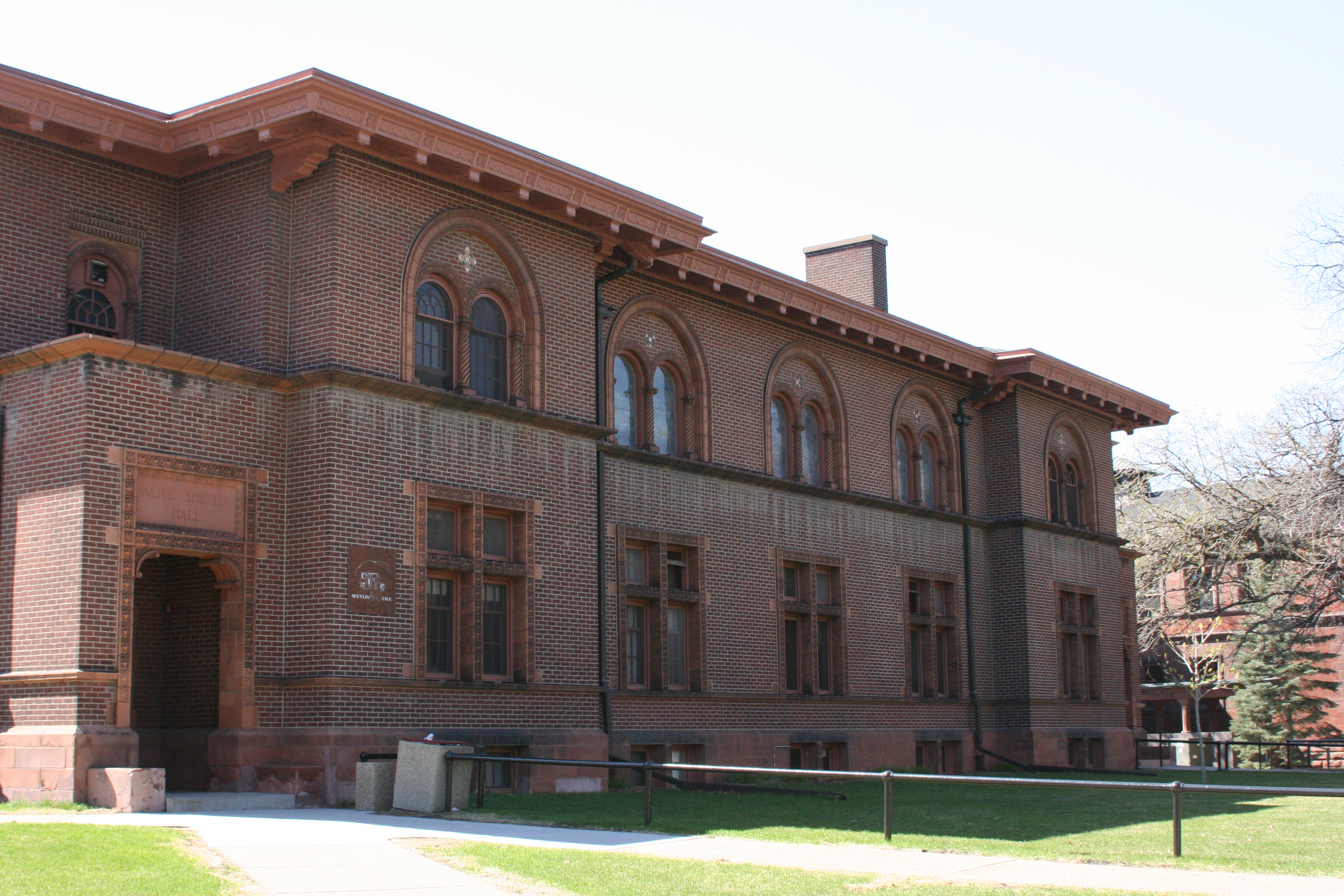
Shevlin Hall in 2005

Architect: Ernest Kennedy

Built on the site of Old Main, the first building on campus, after it burned down in 1904. The building was a gift from Minneapolis lumberman Thomas H. Shevlin (1852-1912), named in honor of his wife Alice Ann Hall Shevlin (1864-1910). Until it moved to Coffman Memorial Union in 1940, Shevlin Hall served as the women's student union, providing women with basic amenities such as restrooms, and a space to engage in intellectual and social pursuits. Today, the building currently houses the Speech-Language-Hearing Sciences department and a rock with a plaque commemorating the former Old Main sits in the front.

== Folwell Hall, 1907 ==
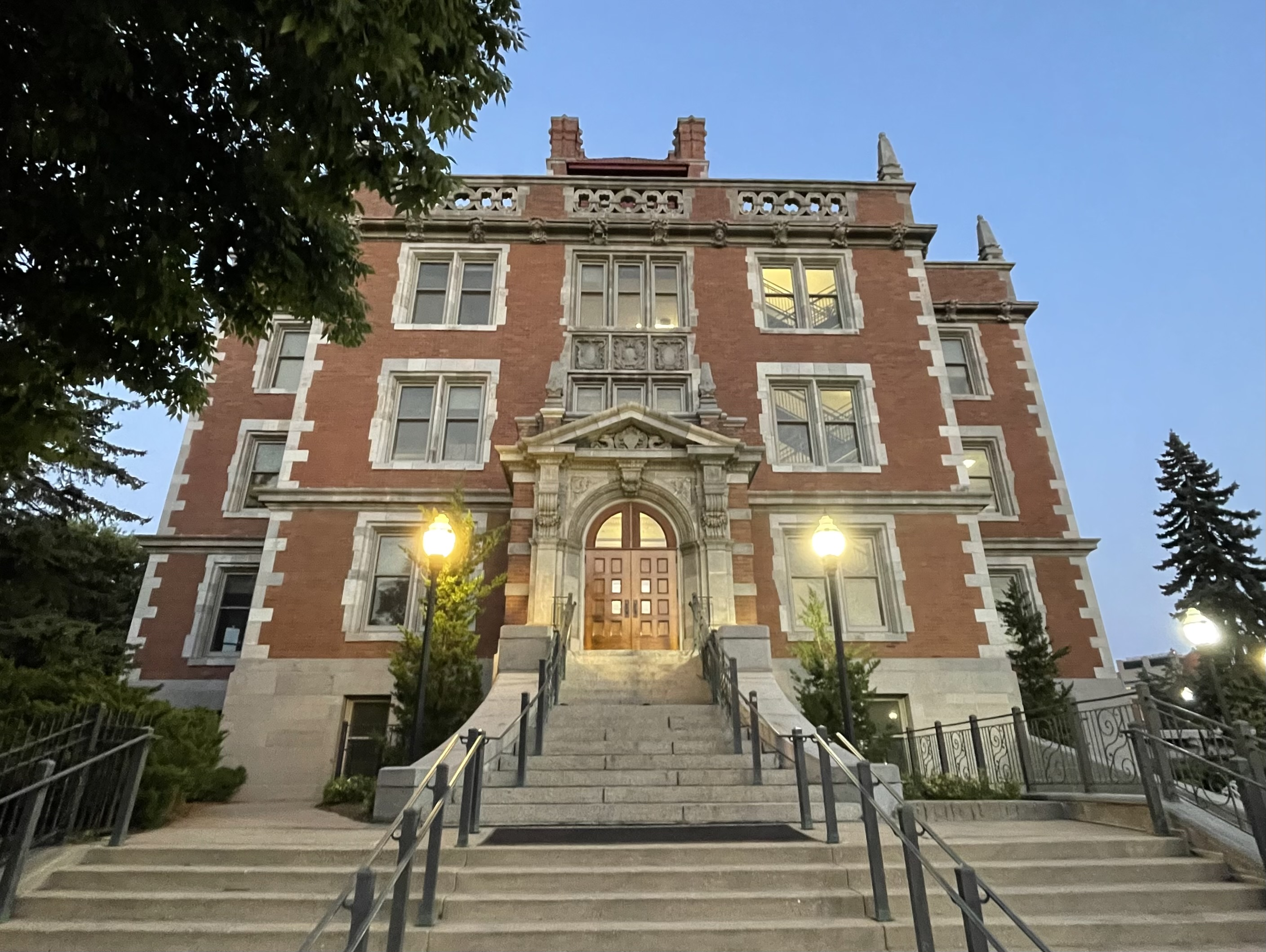
Folwell Hall in 2023

Architect: Clarence H. Johnston Sr.

Designed in the Jacobethan Revival style by Minnesota State Architect Clarence H. Johnston, it was built to house departments displaced after the burning of Old Main in 1904. These included the Pedagogy, Oratory, and Psychology departments, as well as the Alumni Magazine, German Museum, Gopher Yearbook, and Minnesota Daily. It is now home to a majority of the university's foreign language departments.

The building, which received an extensive rehabilitation in 2012, is considered one of the most elaborate on campus. Its exterior features include carved brick detailing, balustrades, parapets, gargoyles, and many chimneys. Interior features include polished marble hallways, fireplaces, and ornate staircases.

Folwell Hall is named in honor of William Watts Folwell, the first president of the University of Minnesota.

== Gallery ==
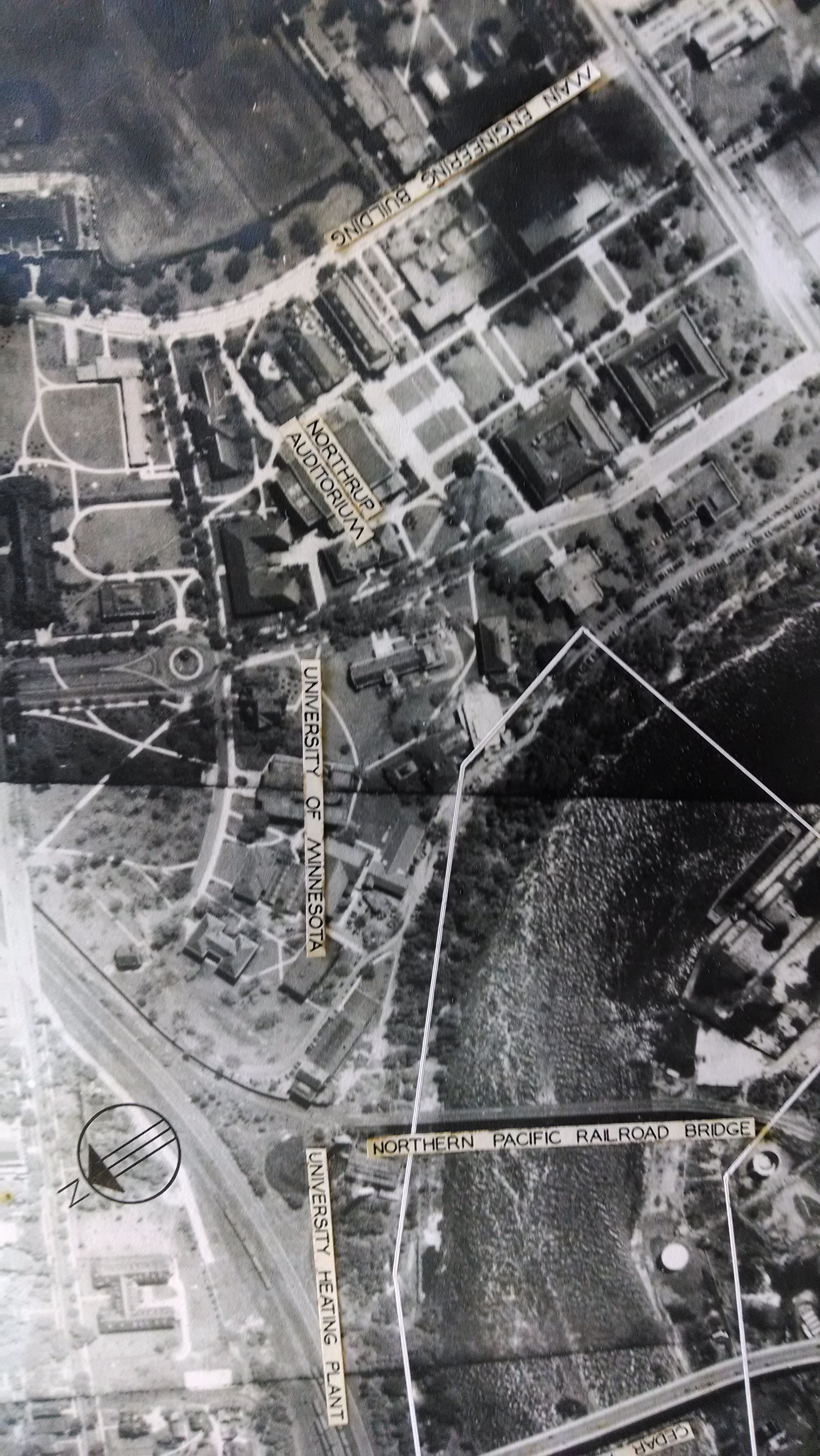
Aerial view of the now-Old Campus Historic District in April 1936

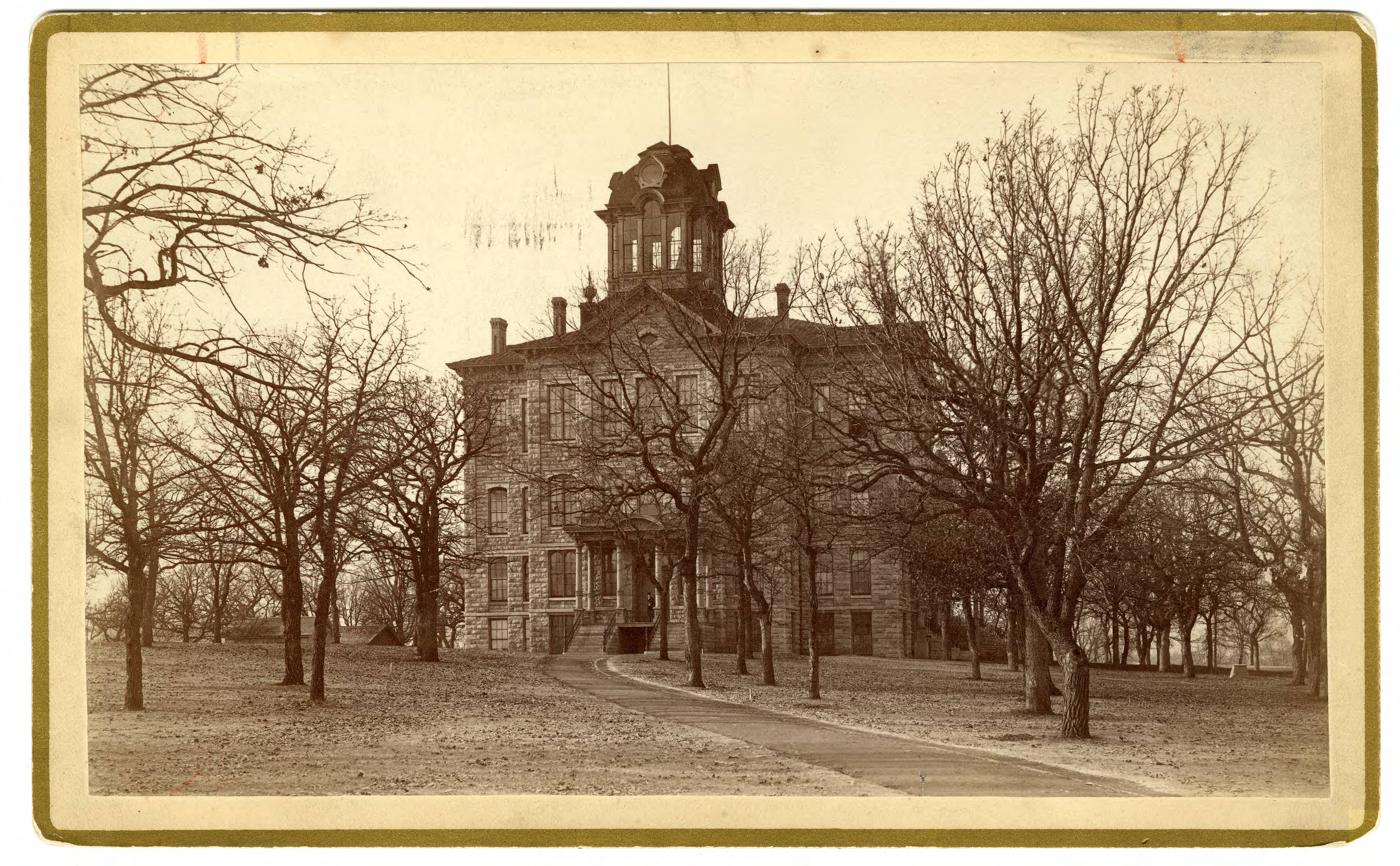
Old Main in 1885

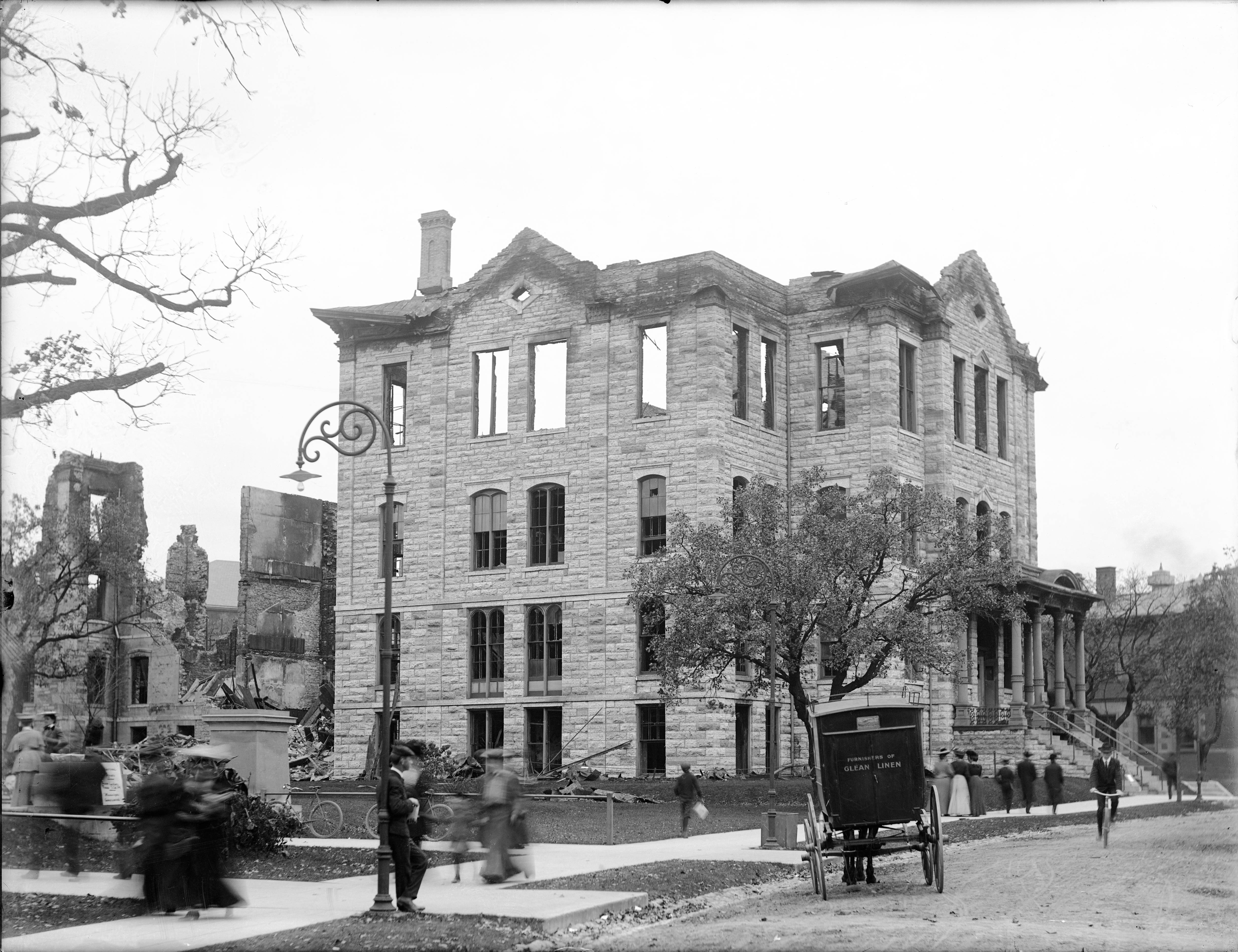
Ruins of Old Main following its destruction from fire in 1904

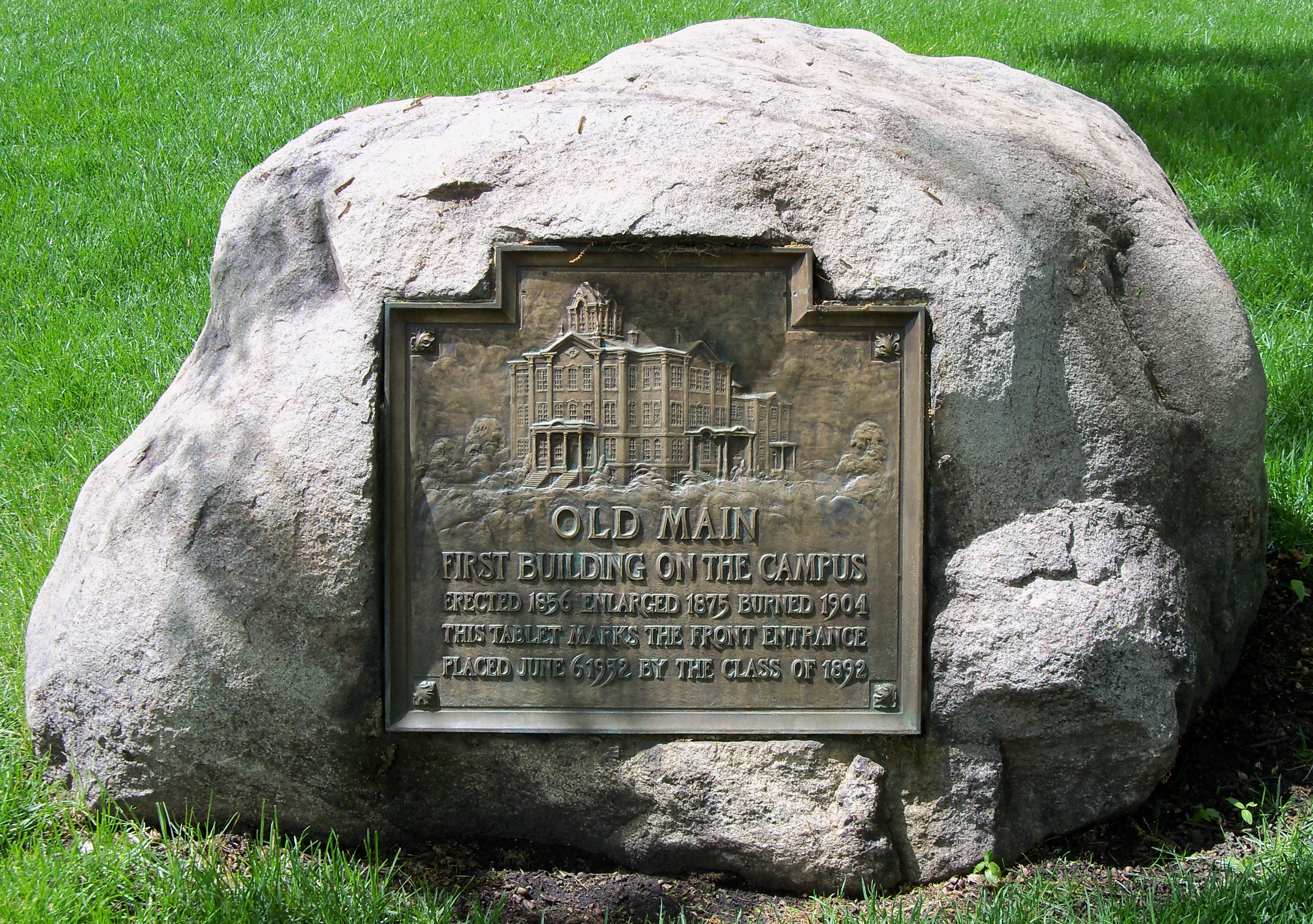
A plaque commemorating the former site of Old Main

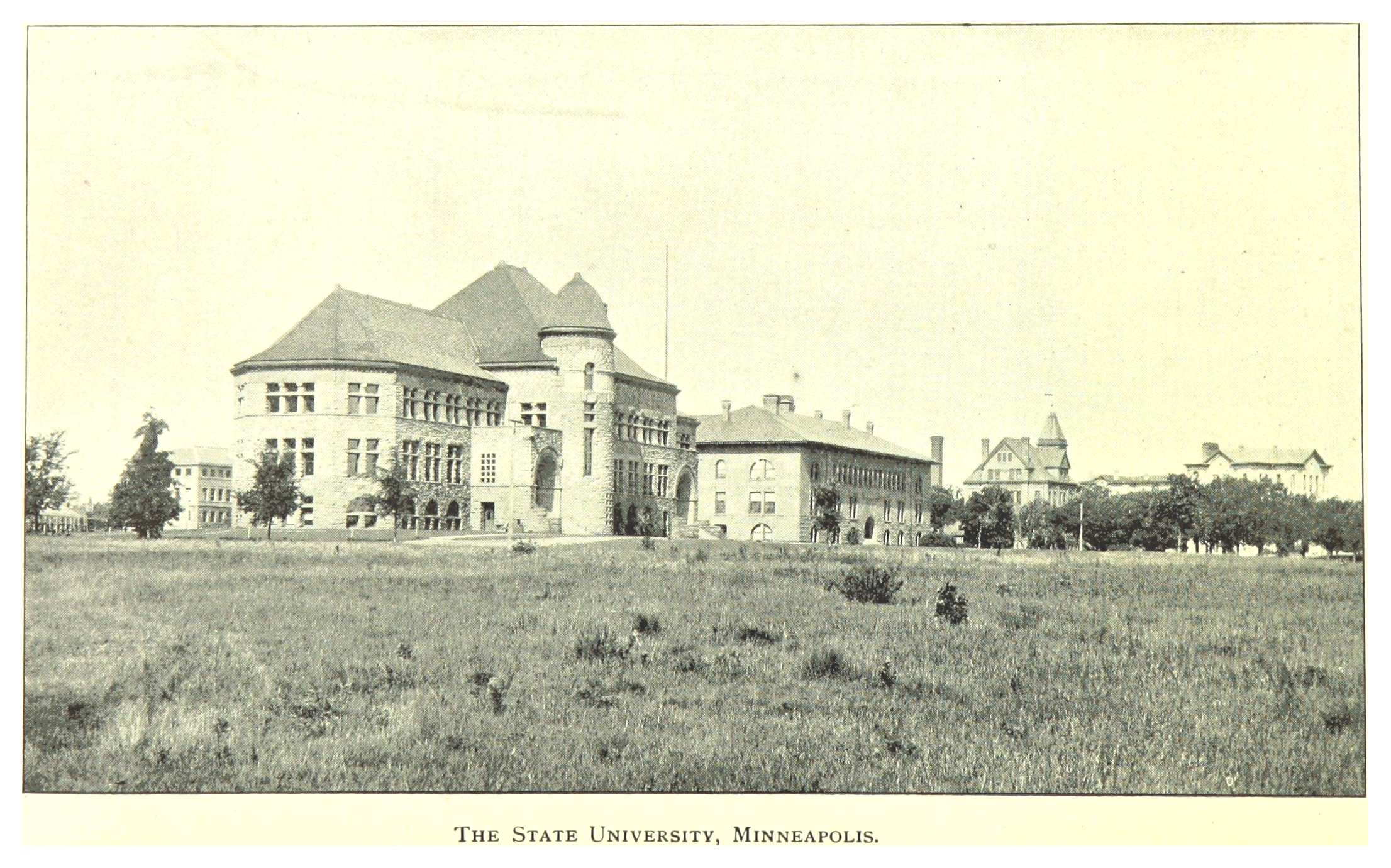
Pillsbury Hall, Nicholson Hall, Eddy Hall, and several other buildings in 1893

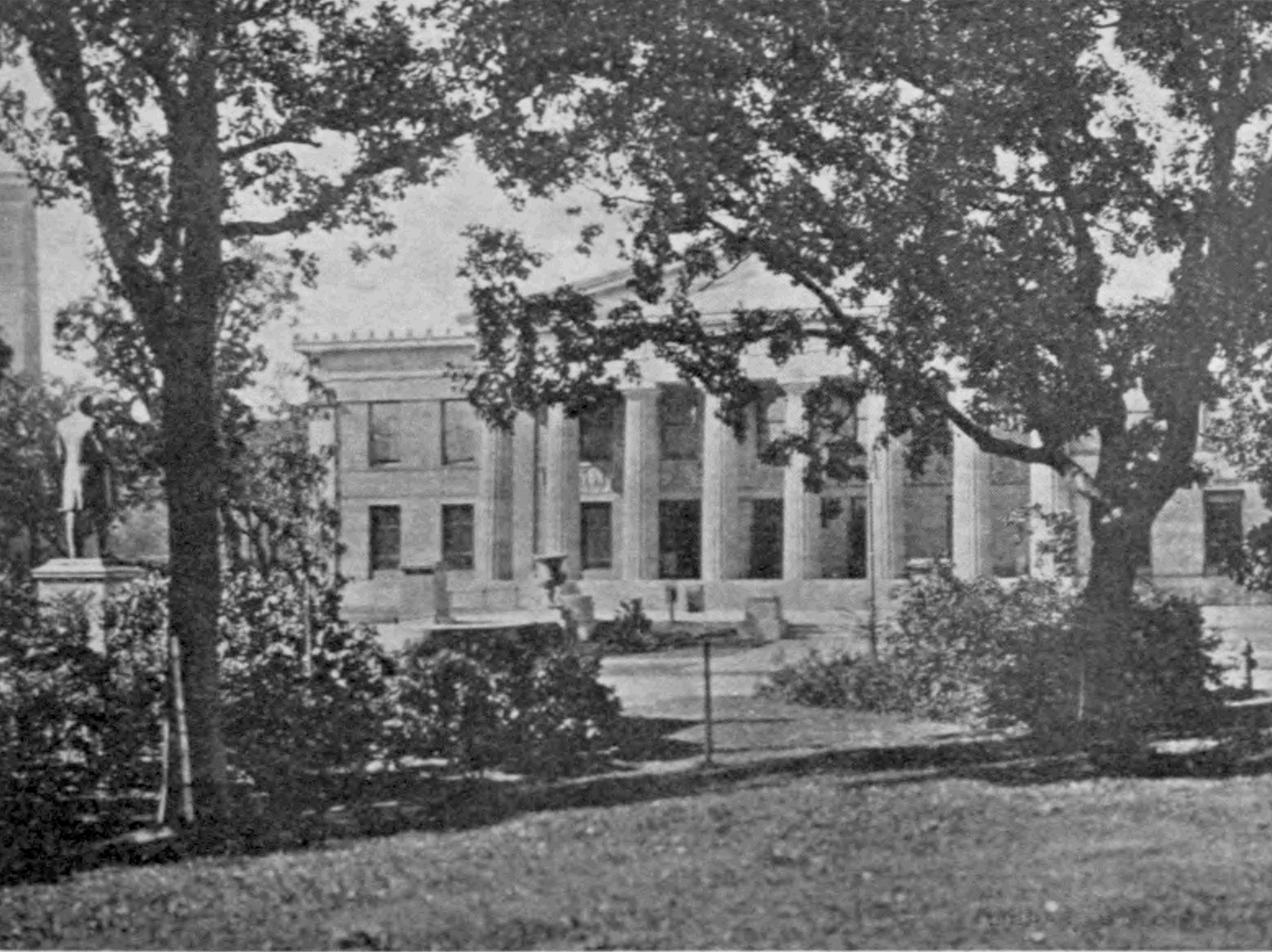
Burton Hall in 1910

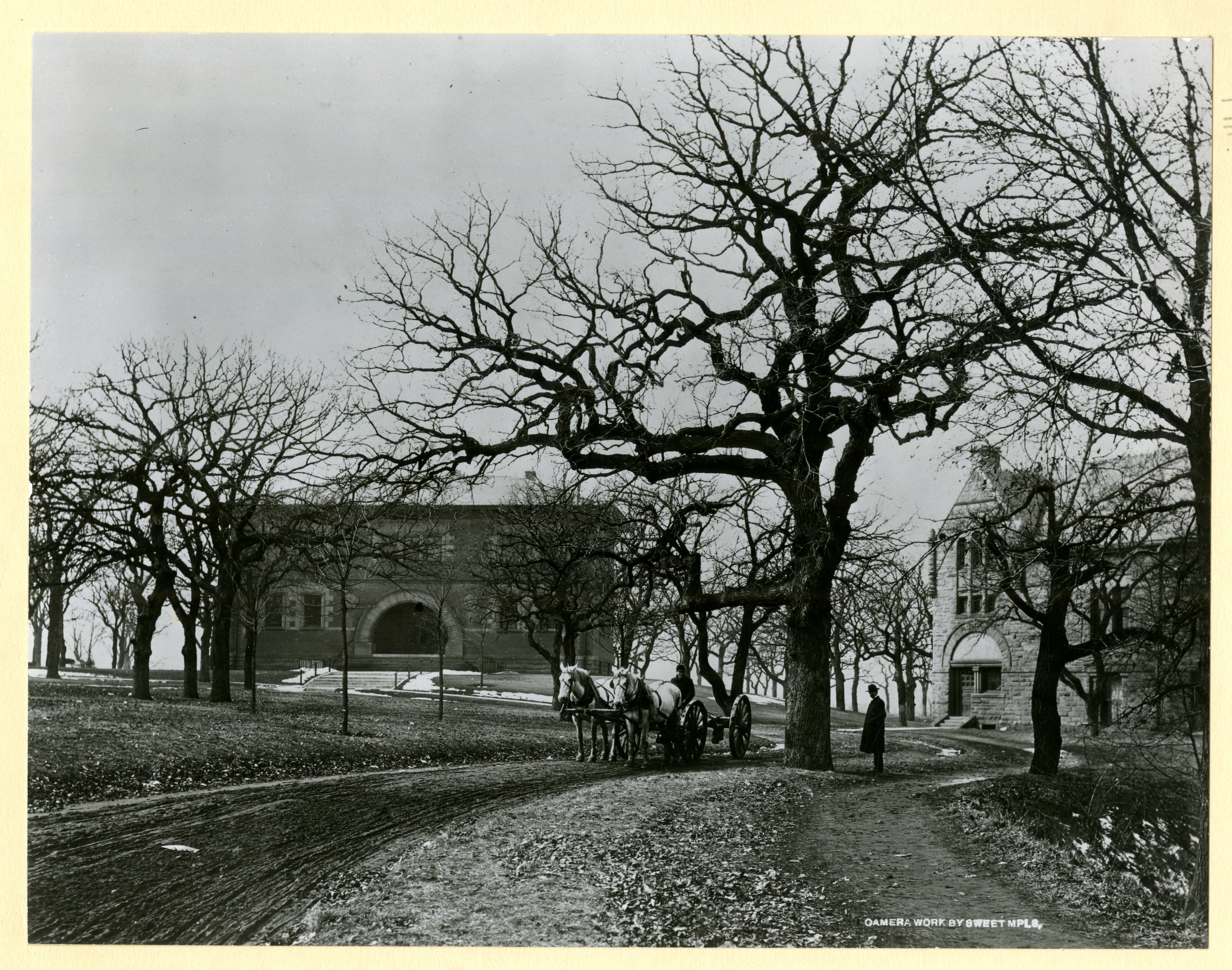
Pattee Hall in 1911

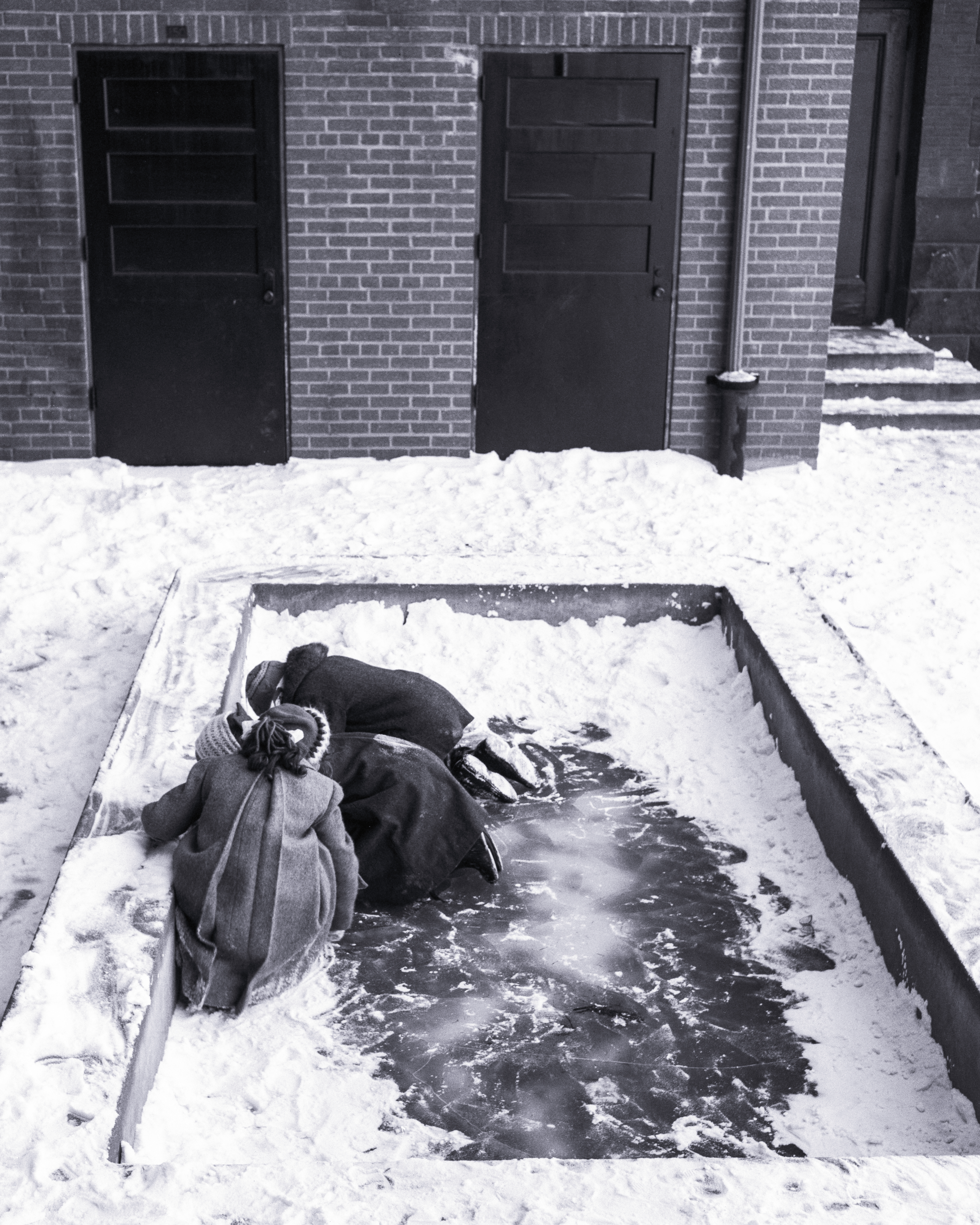
Children playing outside Pattee Hall in 1960

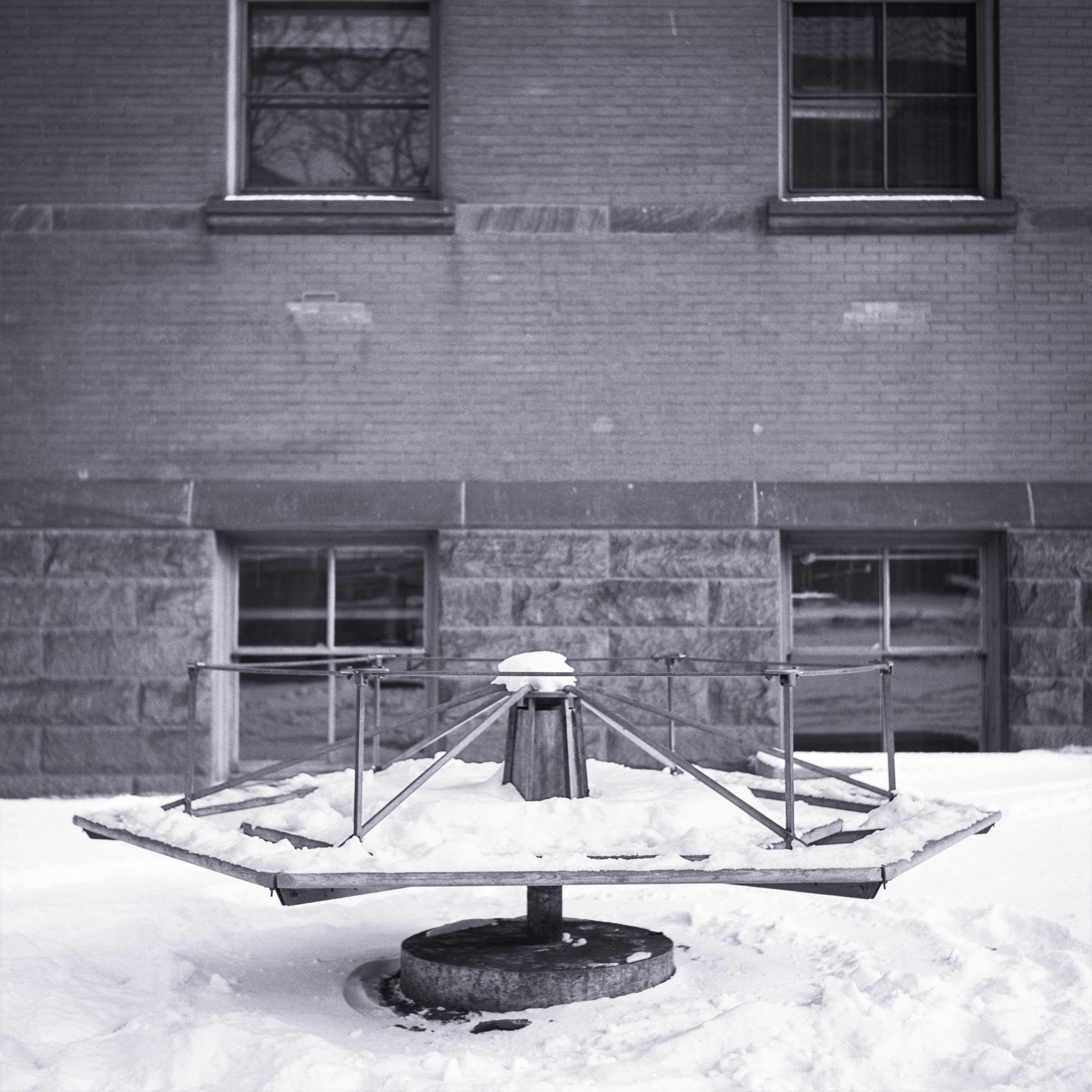
A merry-go-round next to Pattee Hall in 1960

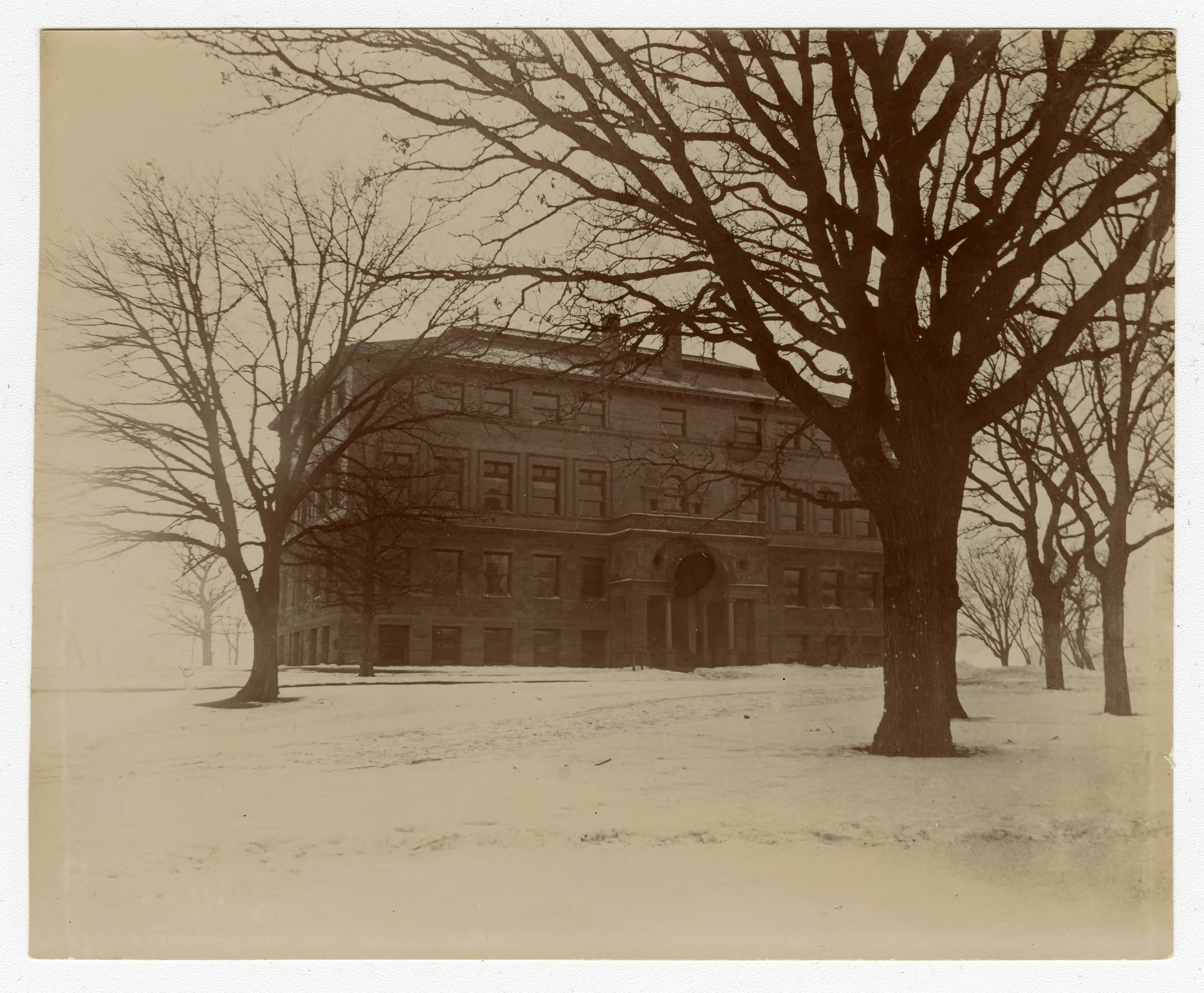
Wulling Hall in 1899

Pillsbury Hall in 1899

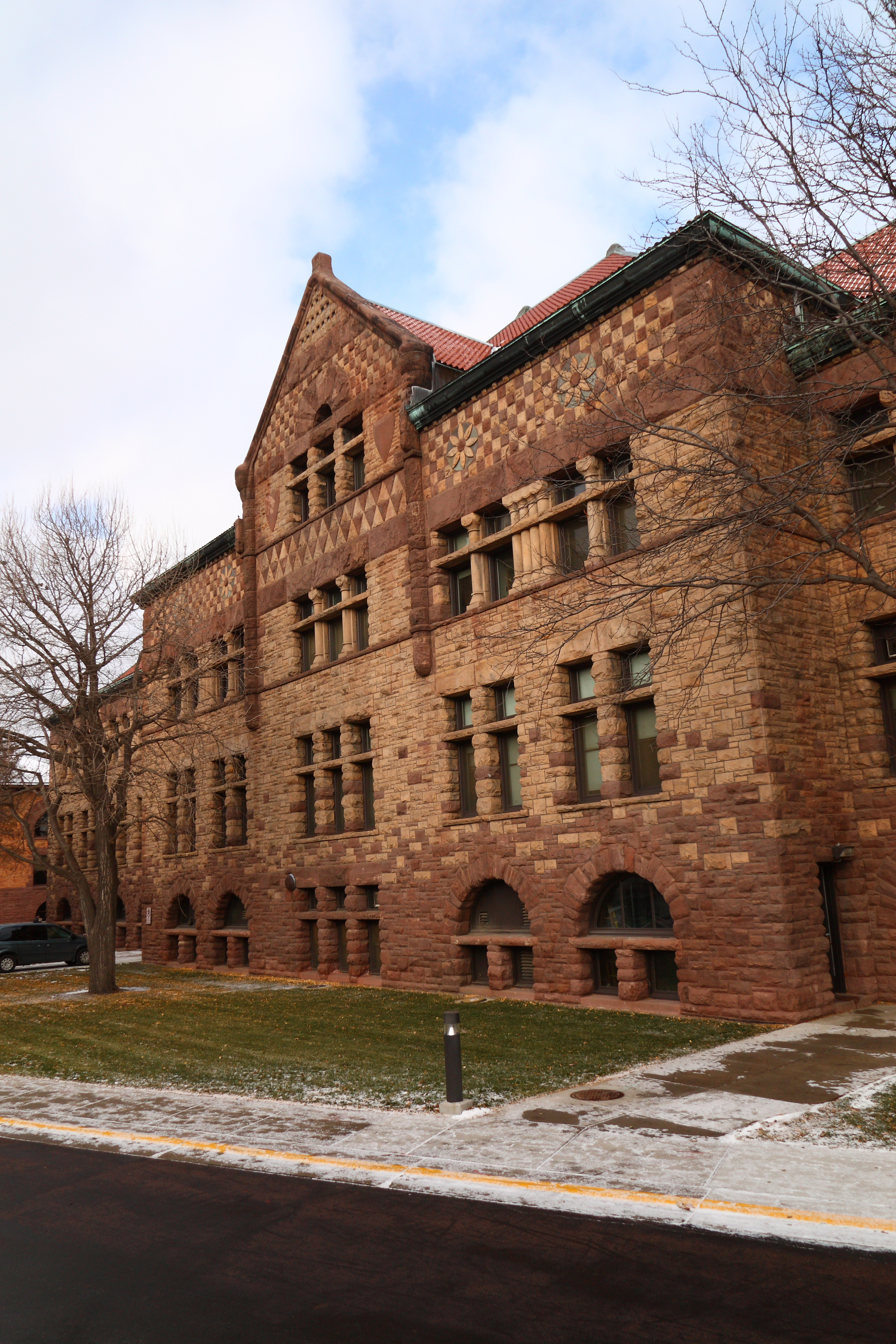
The south facade of Pillsbury Hall

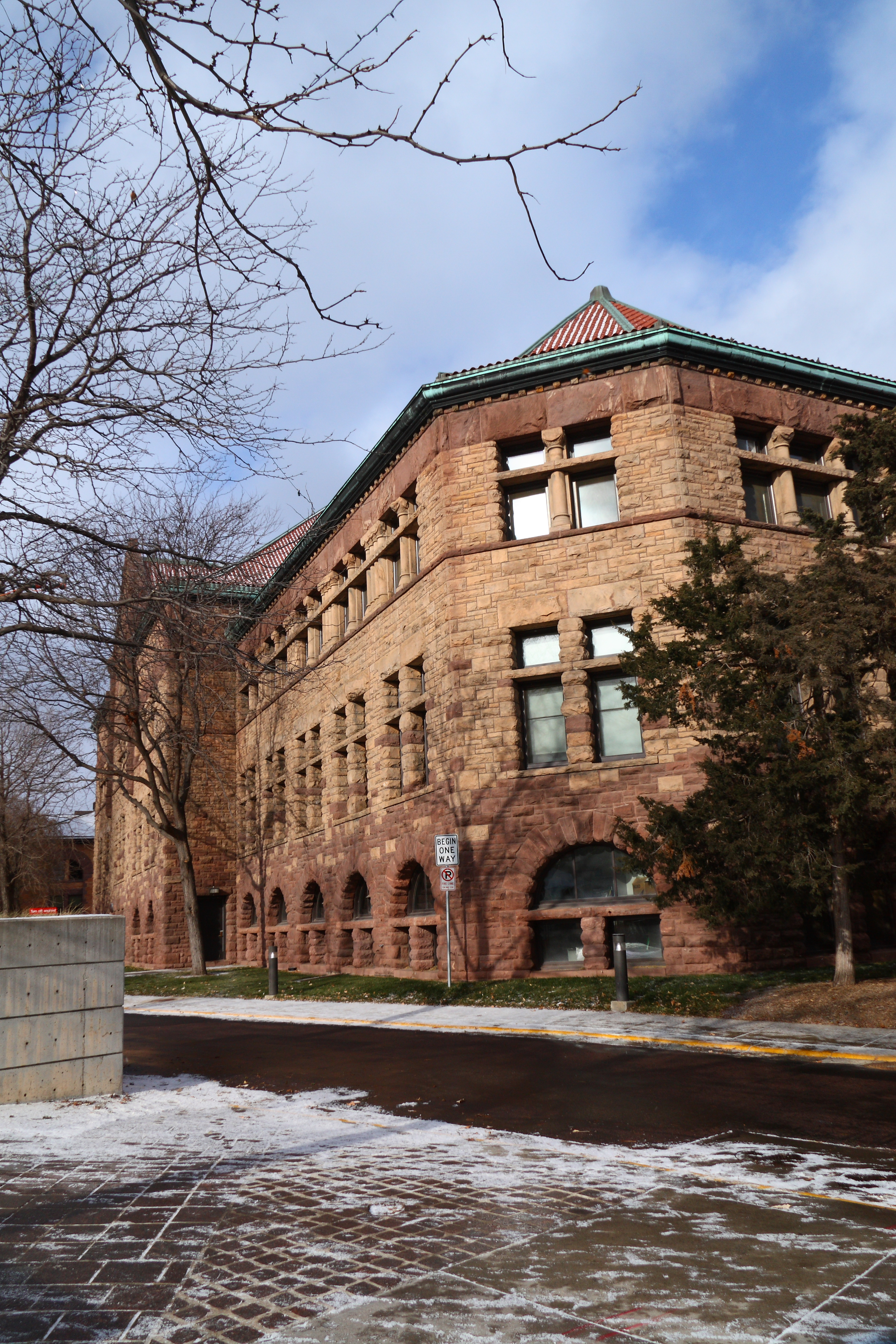
Pillsbury Hall, facing northwest

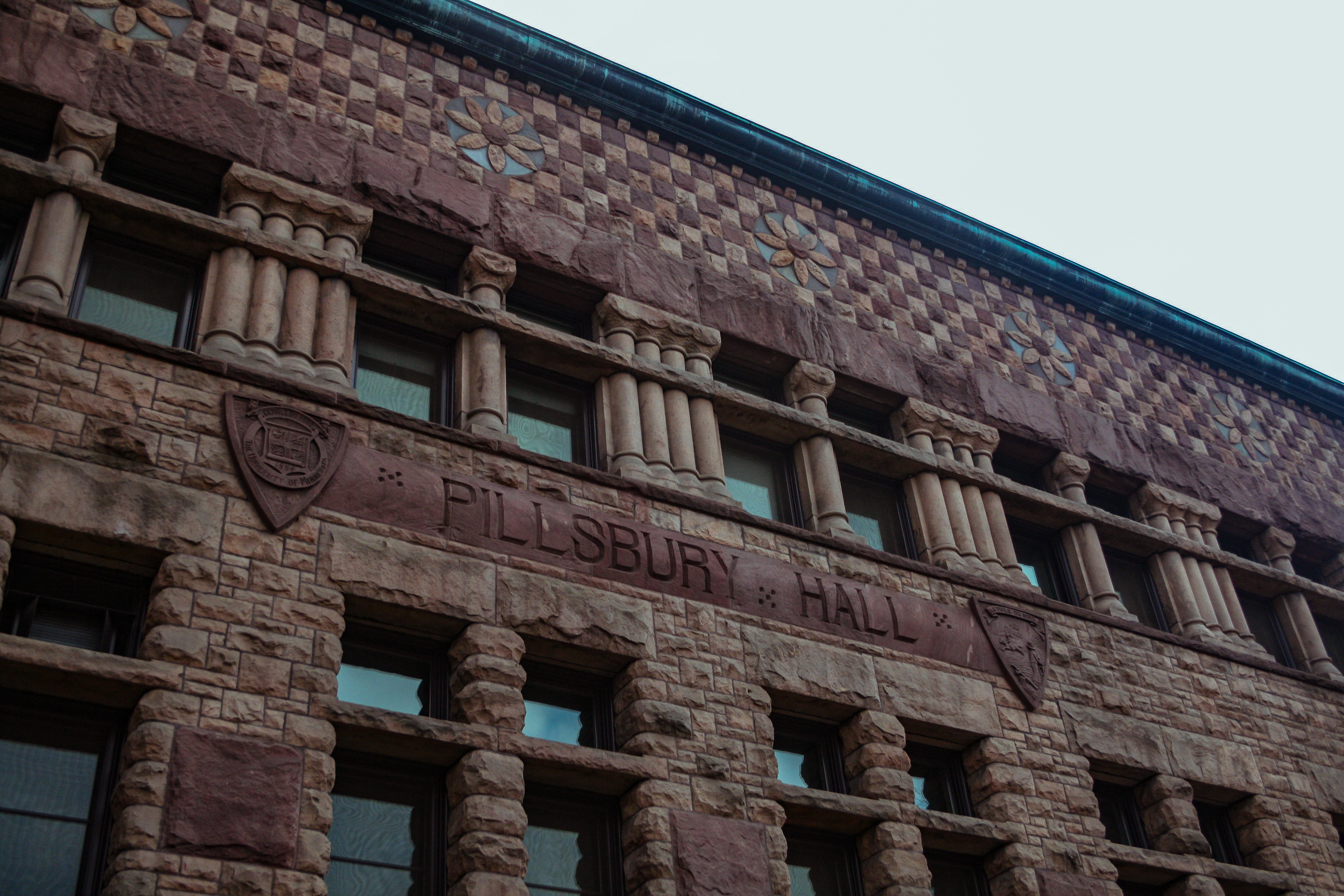
The words "Pillsbury Hall" inscribed on the side of the respective building

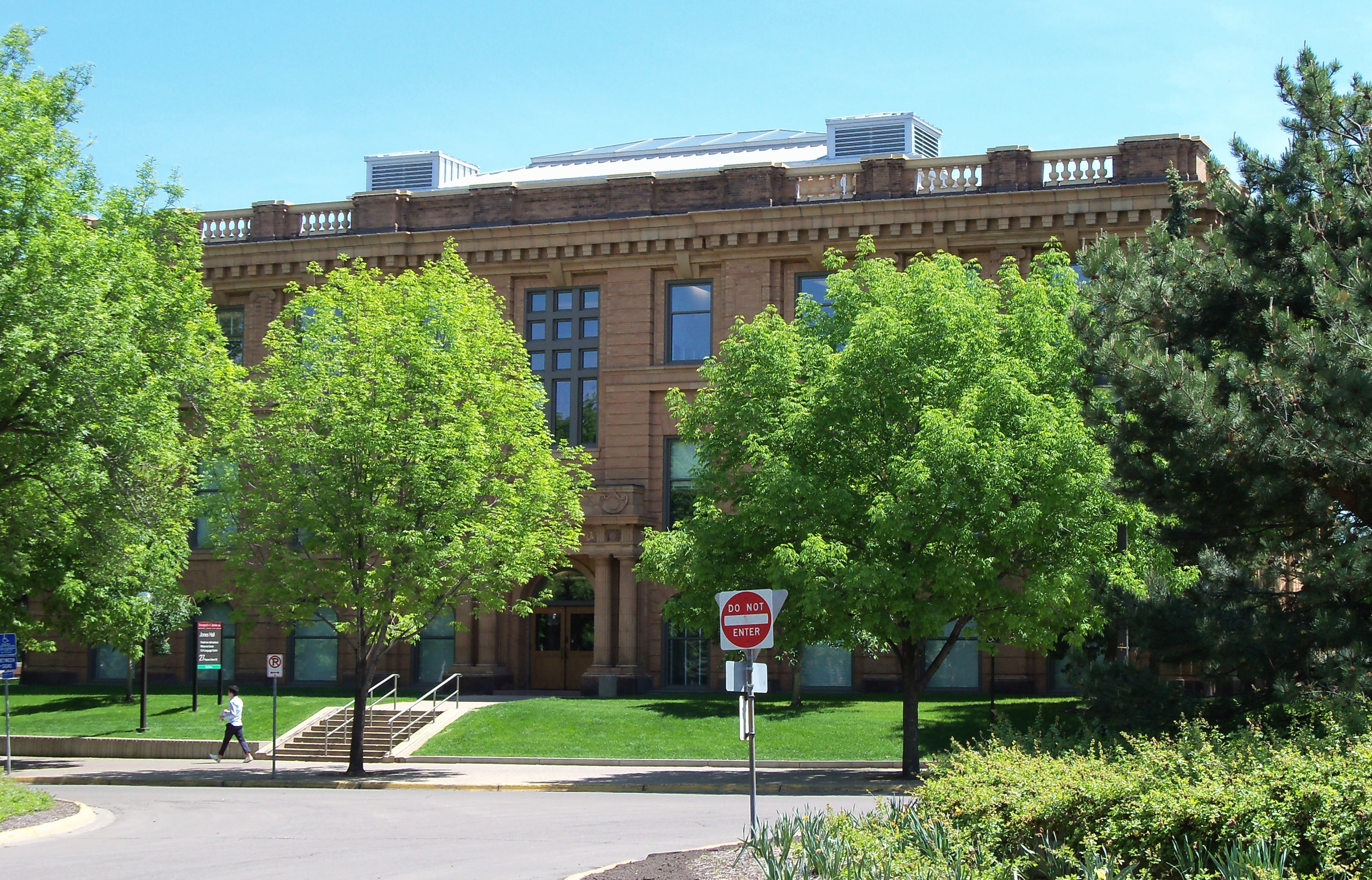
Jones Hall as seen from the Knoll

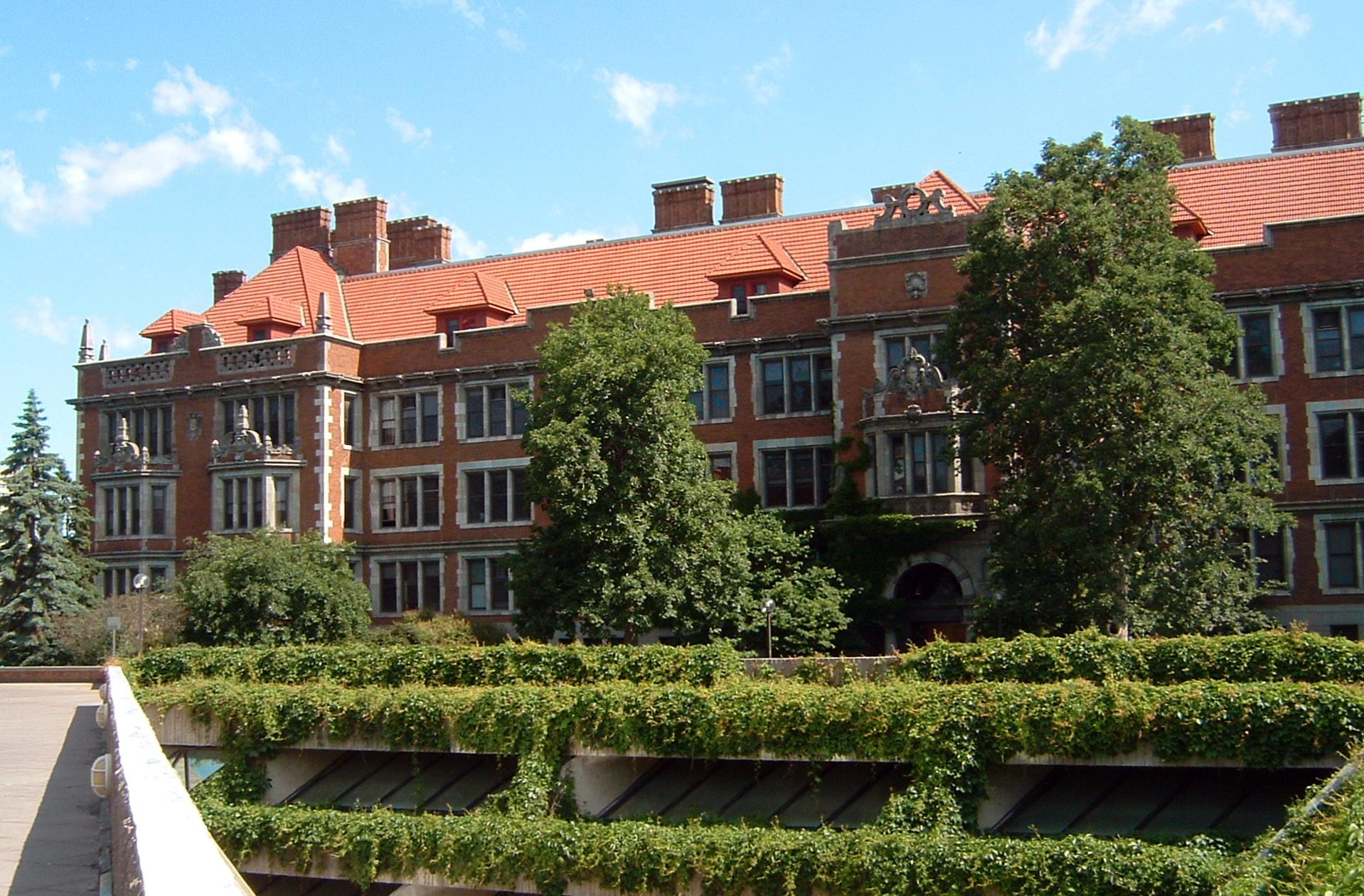
Folwell Hall's southern facade in 2005

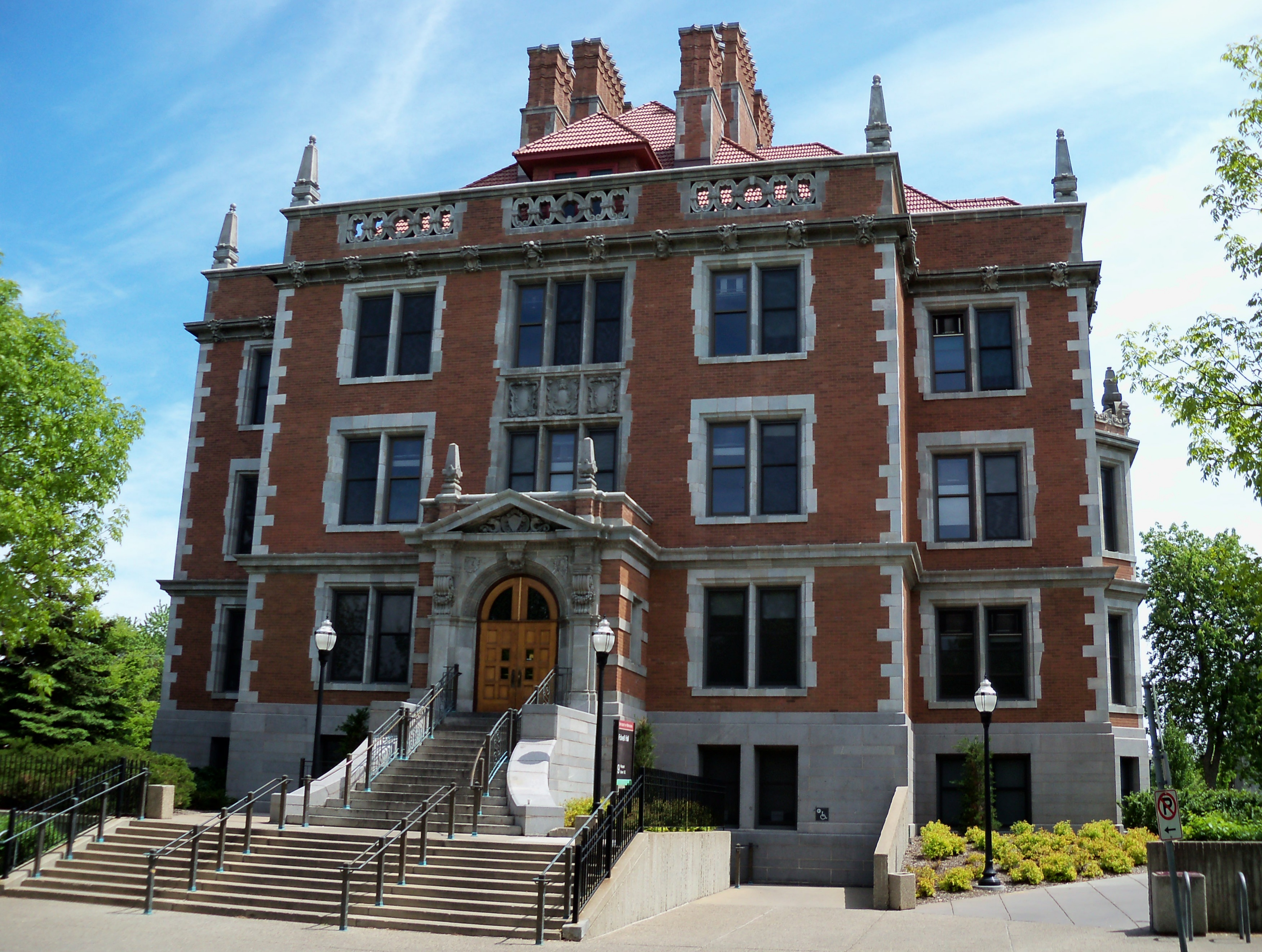
Folwell Hall in 2010

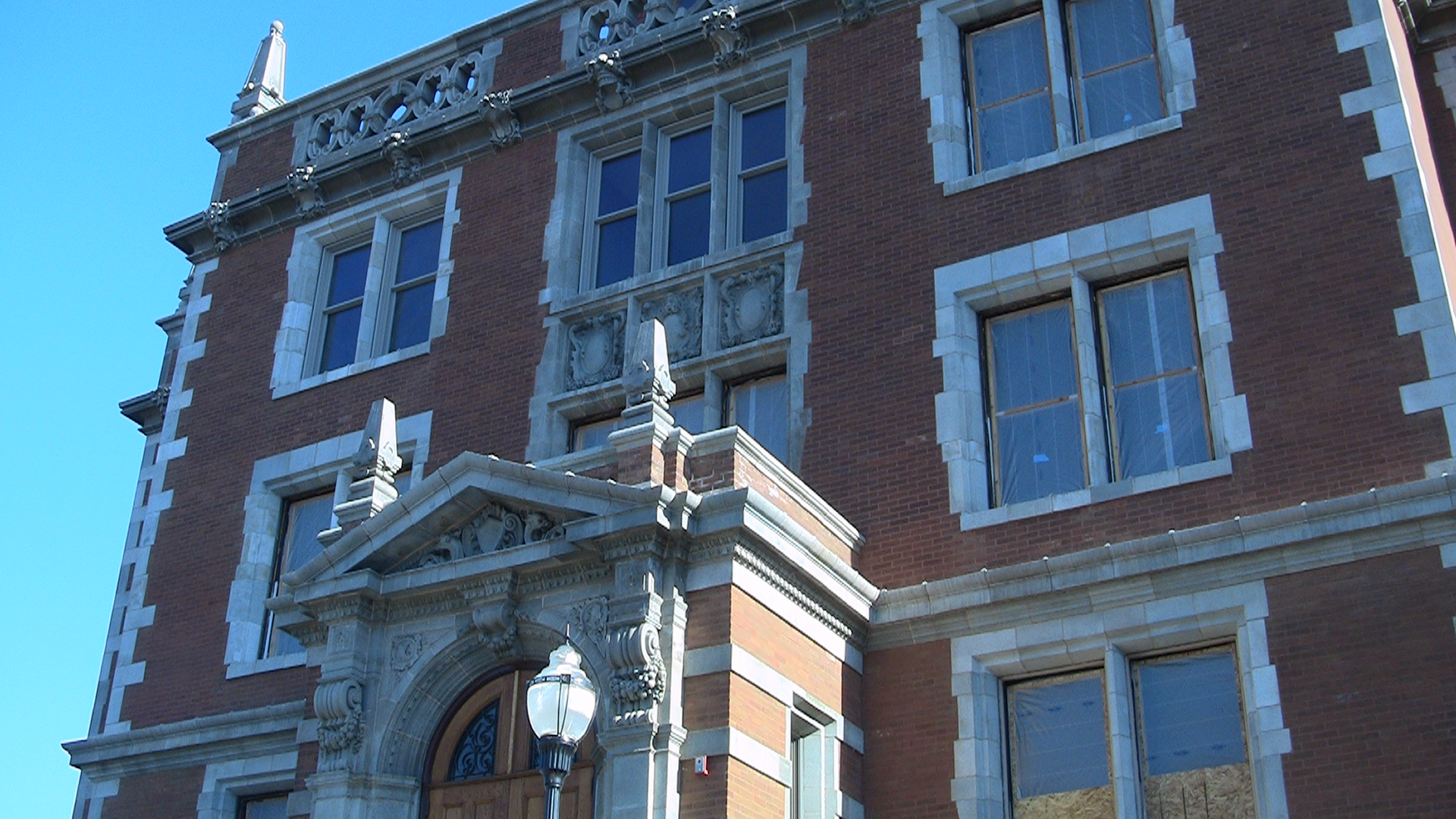
Folwell Hall's entryway during the building's renovation

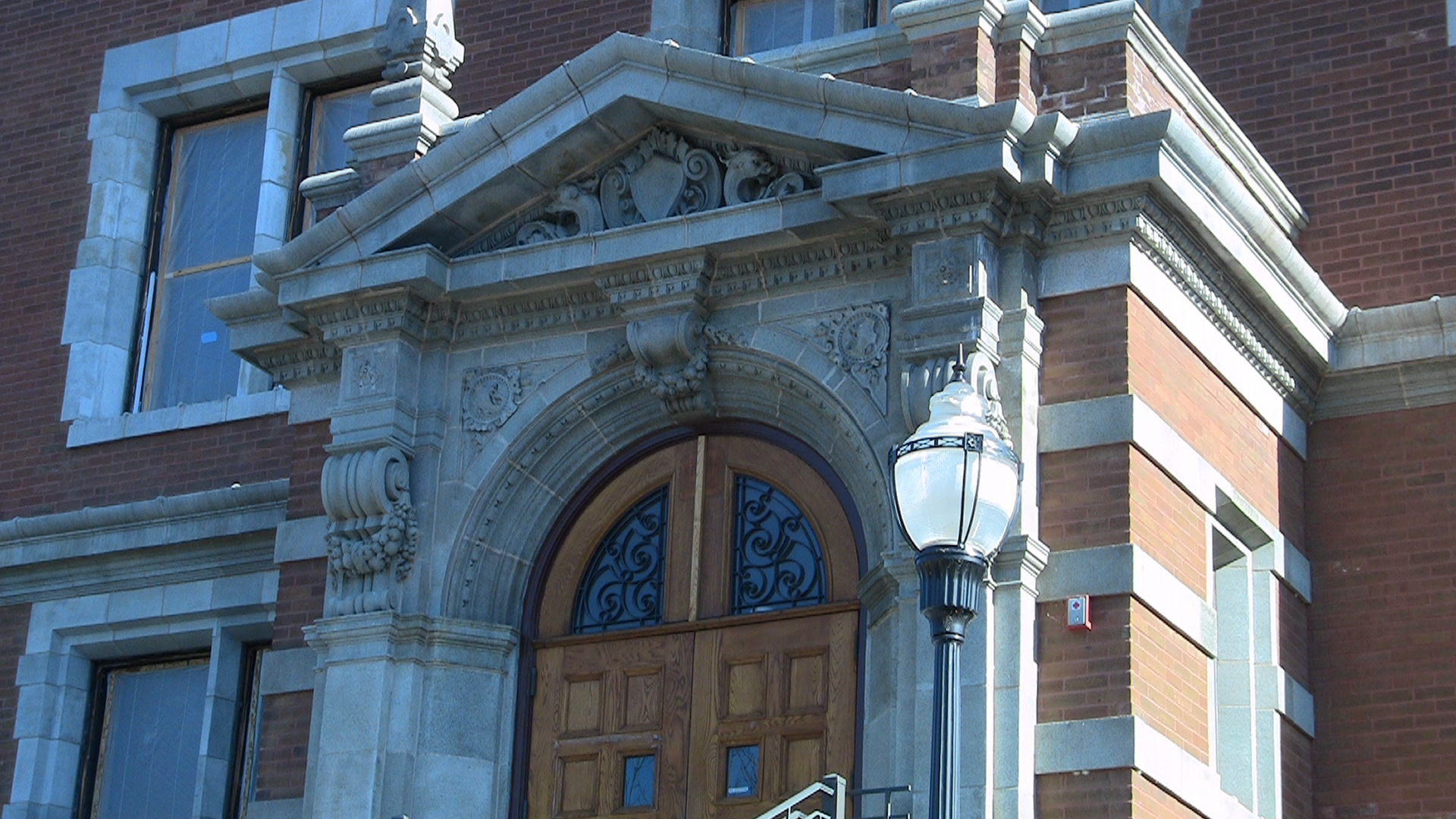
Closeup on the details above Folwell's entryway

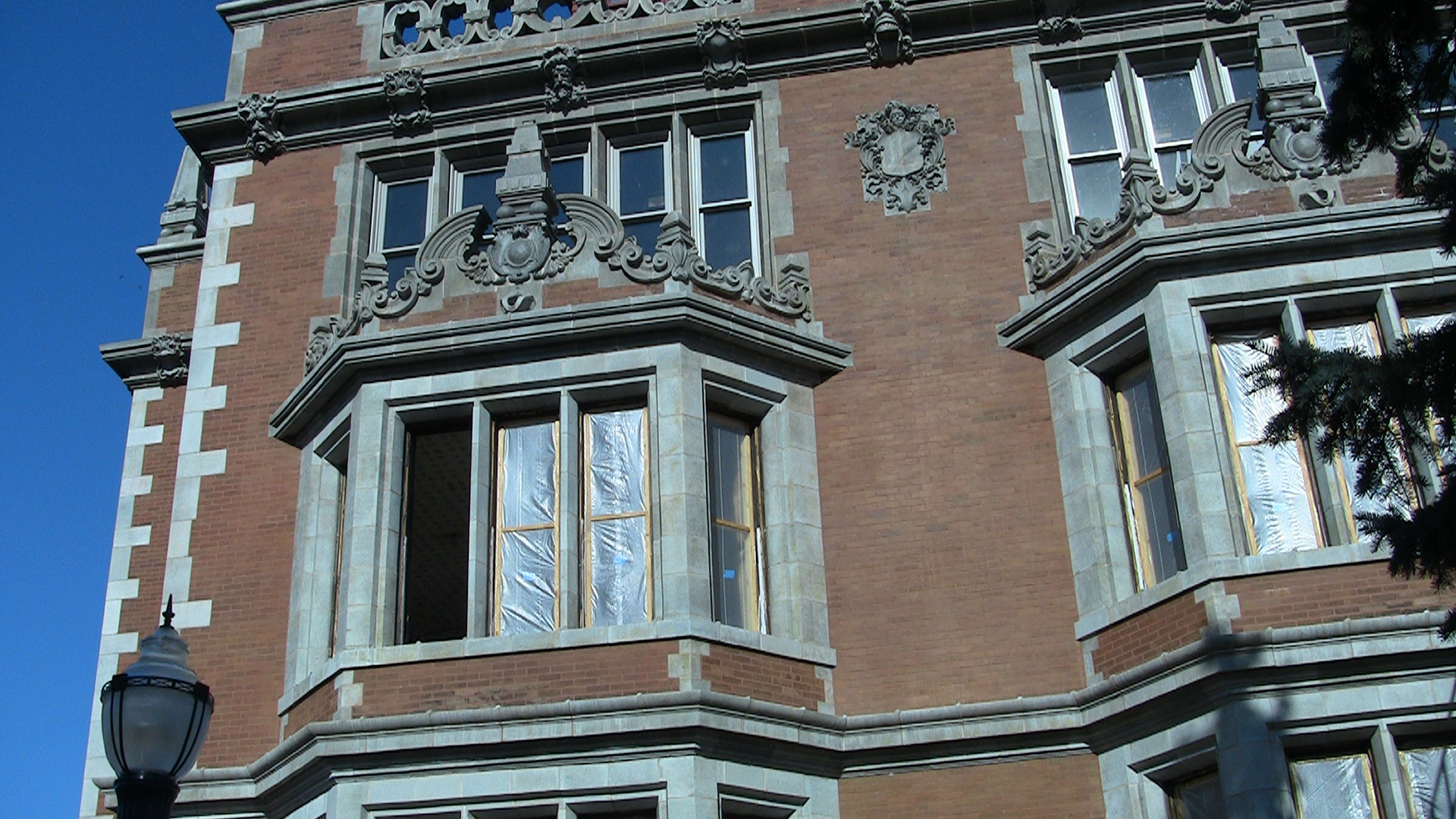
Folwell Hall's windows under renovation

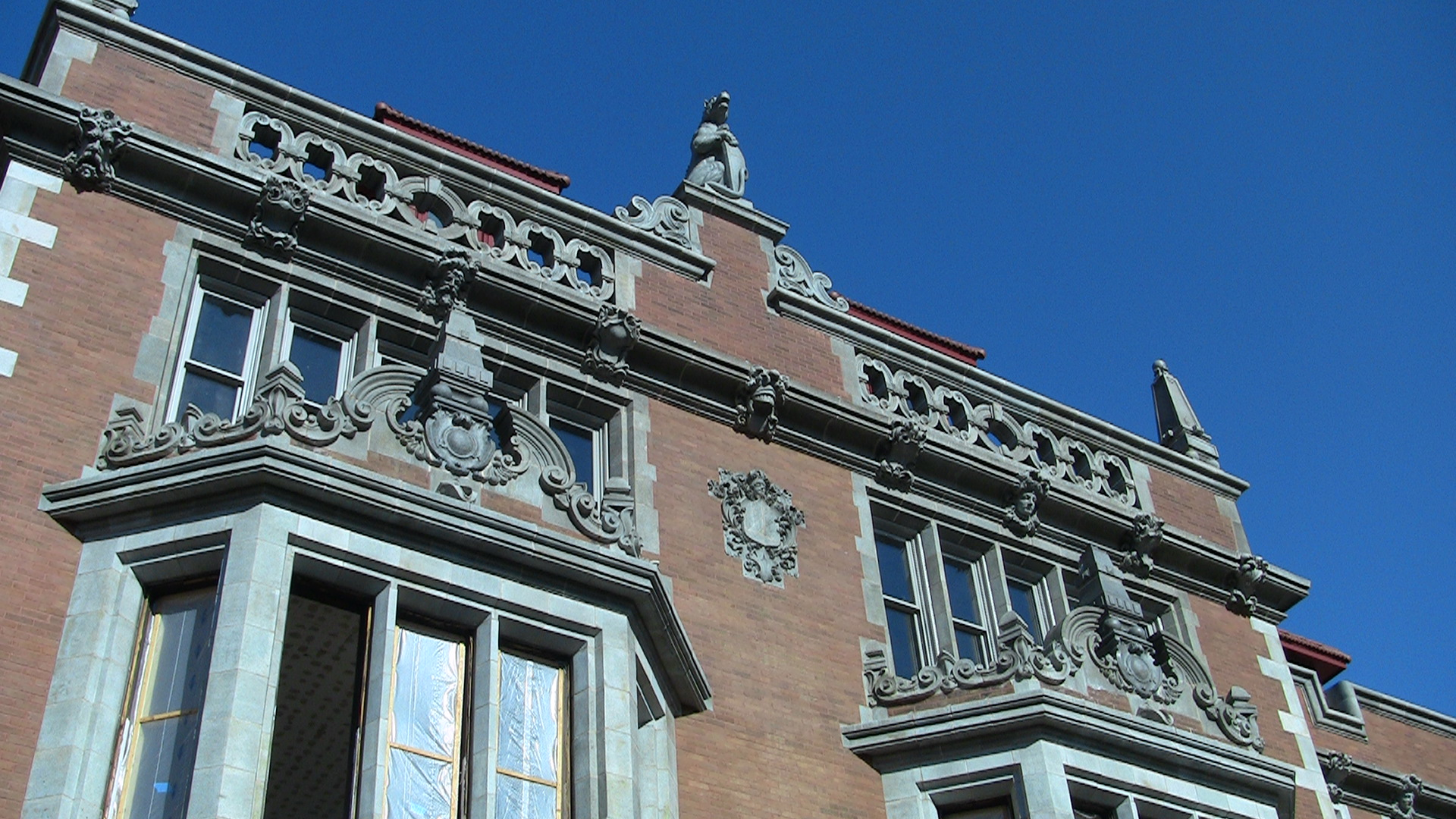
Folwell Hall's roof details

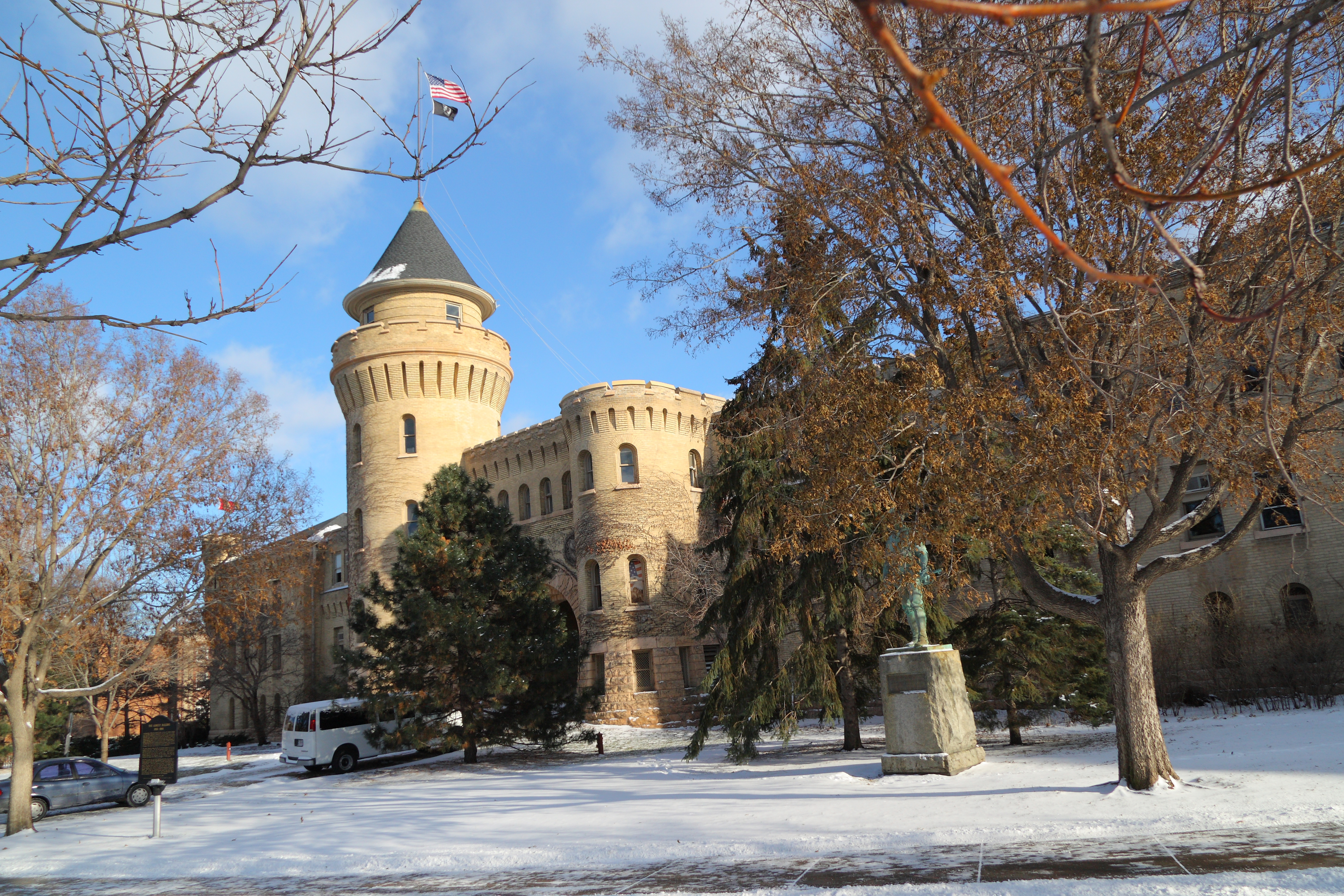
The Armory in December of 2008

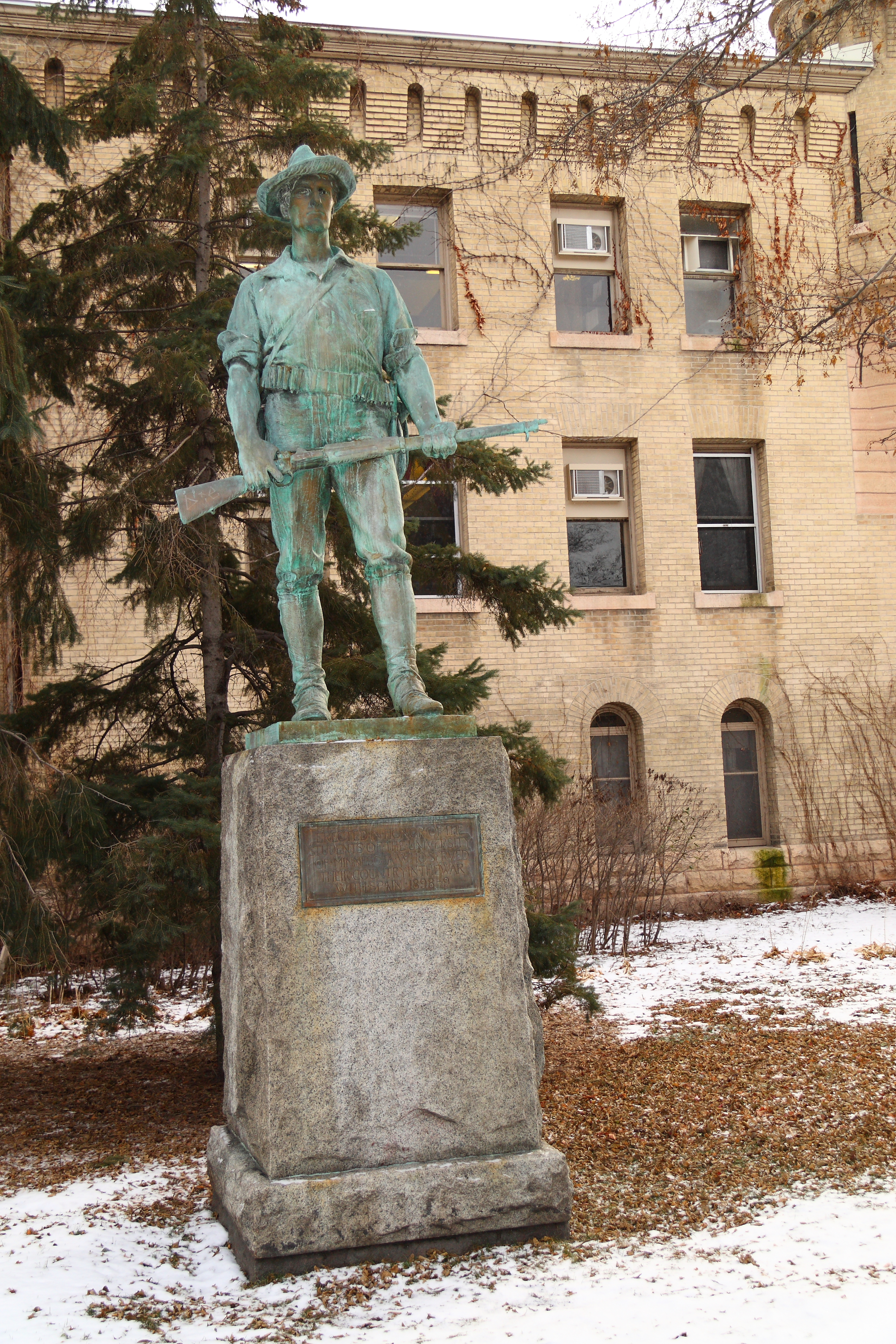
The "Iron Mike" statue outside of the Armory

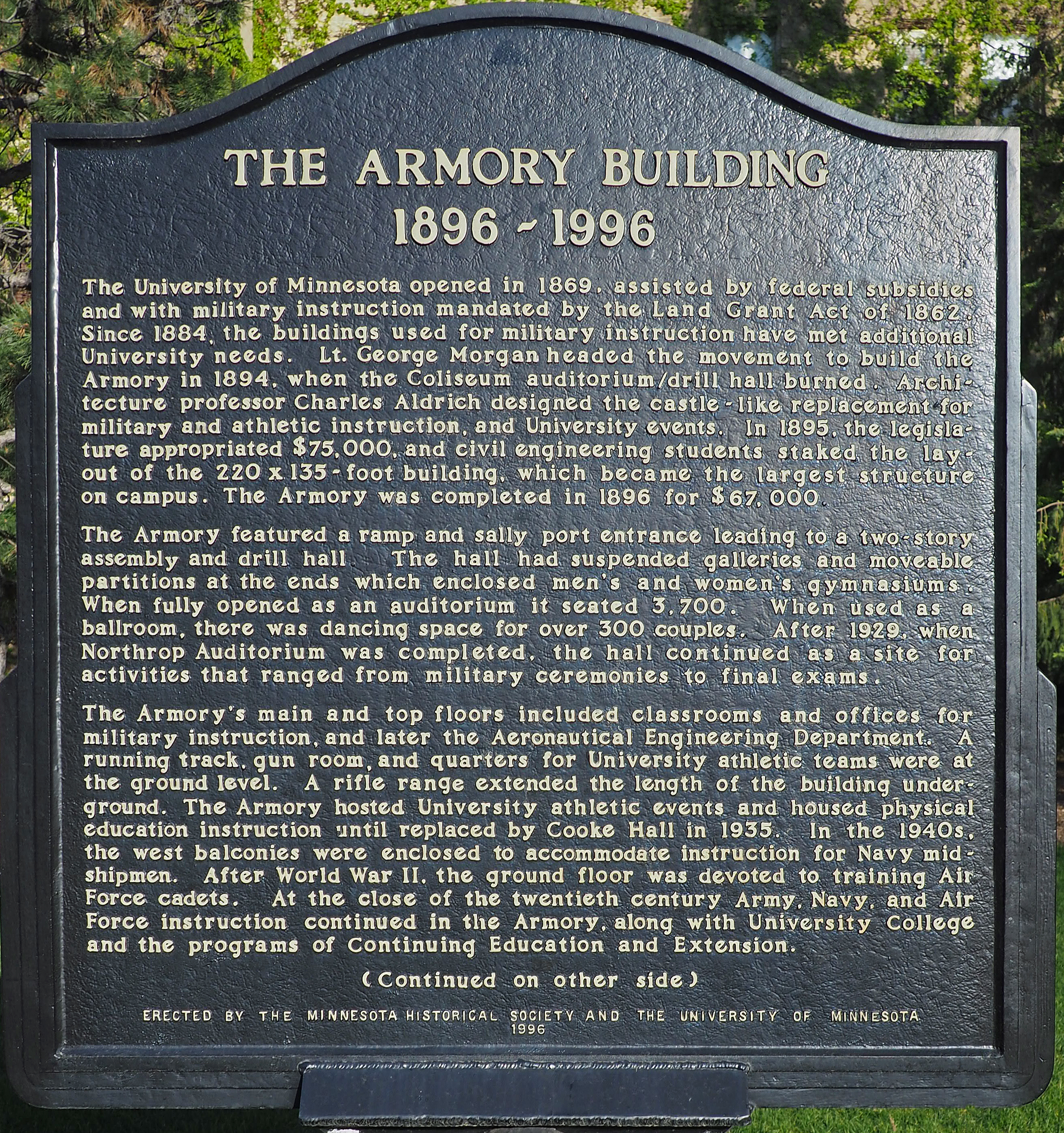
Frontside of a plaque outside the Armory

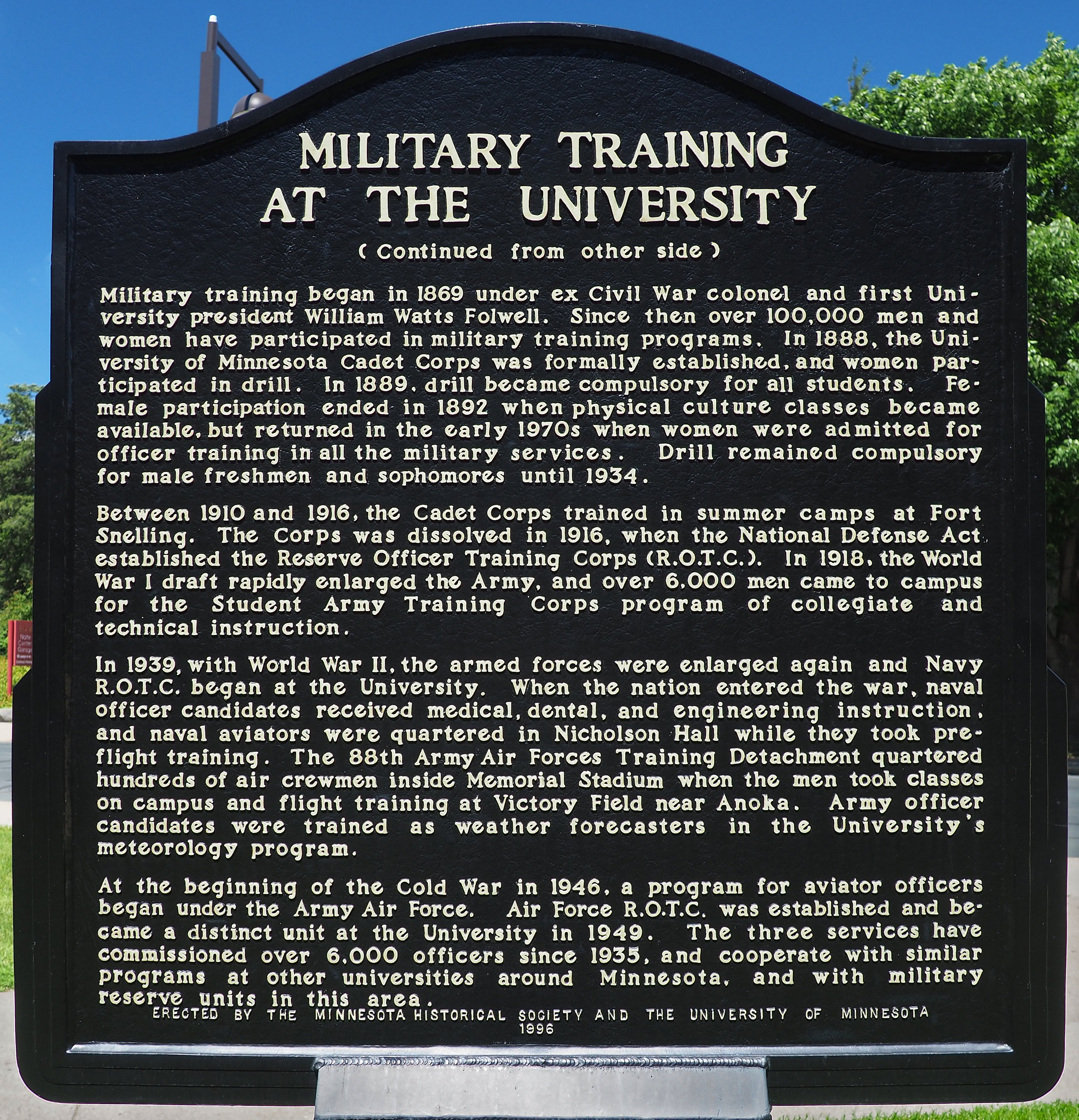
Backside of a plaque outside the Armory

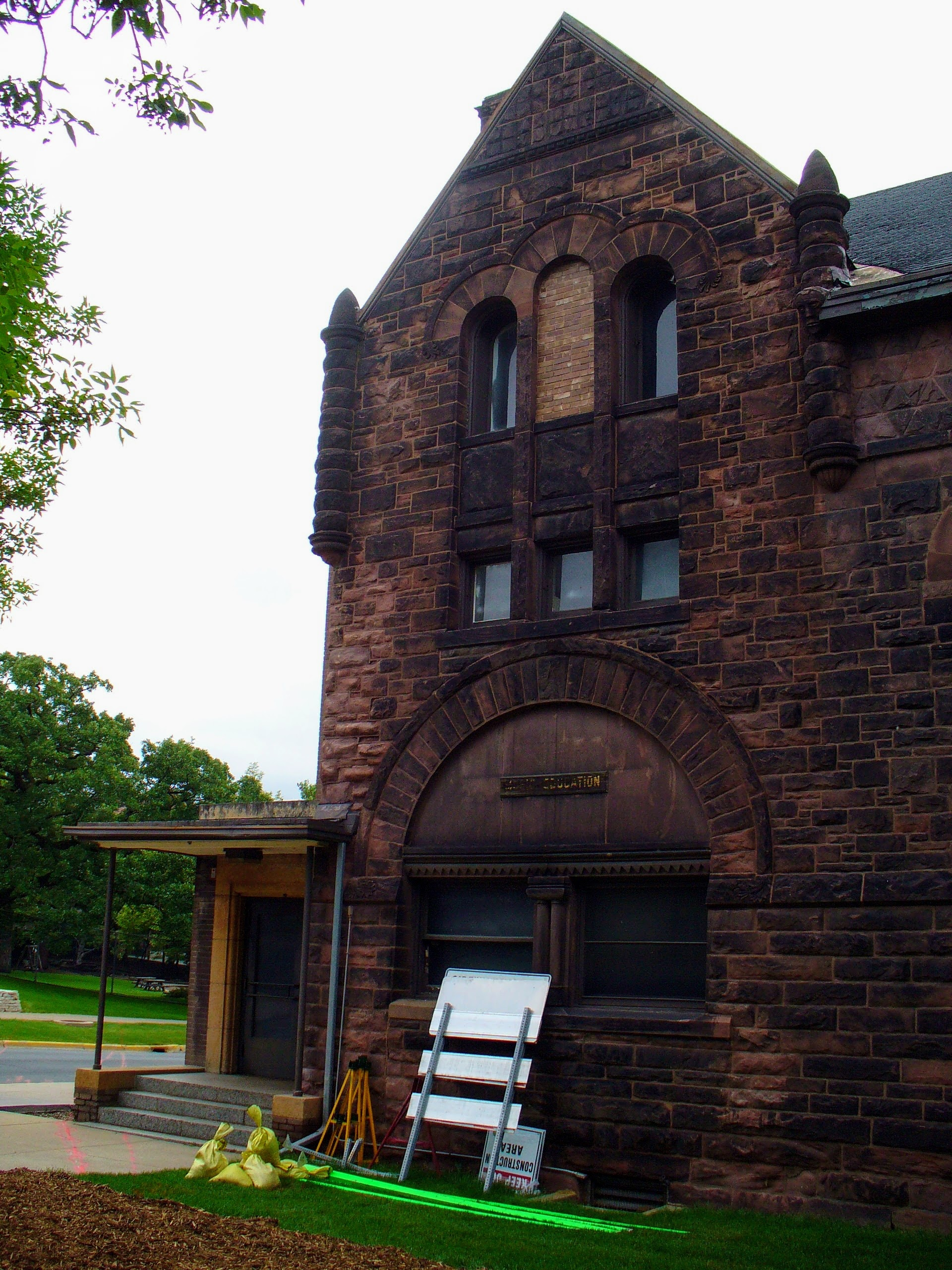
Equipment stacked next to the Music Education building in preparation for its demolition

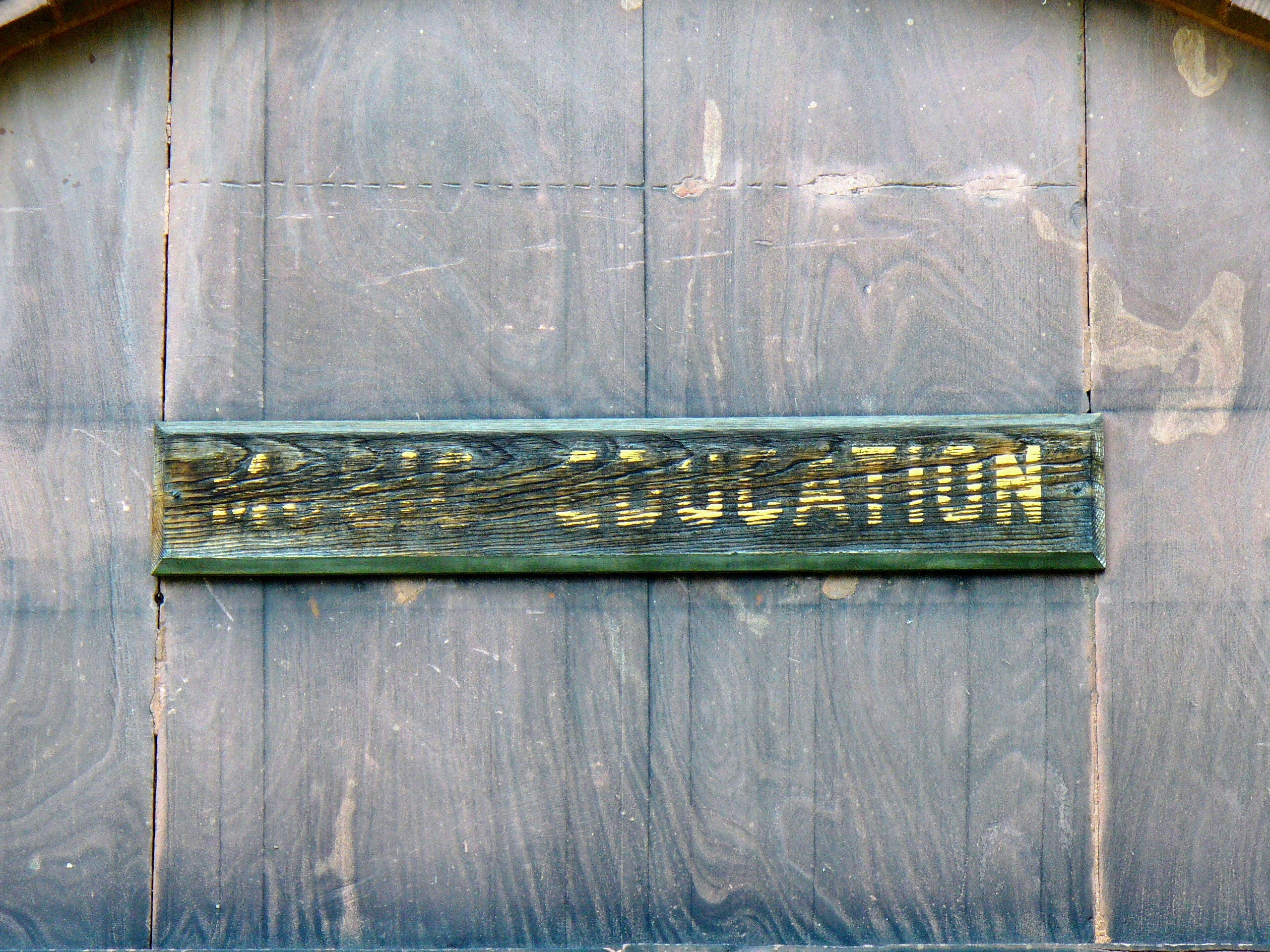
A sign reading "Music Education" on its respective building

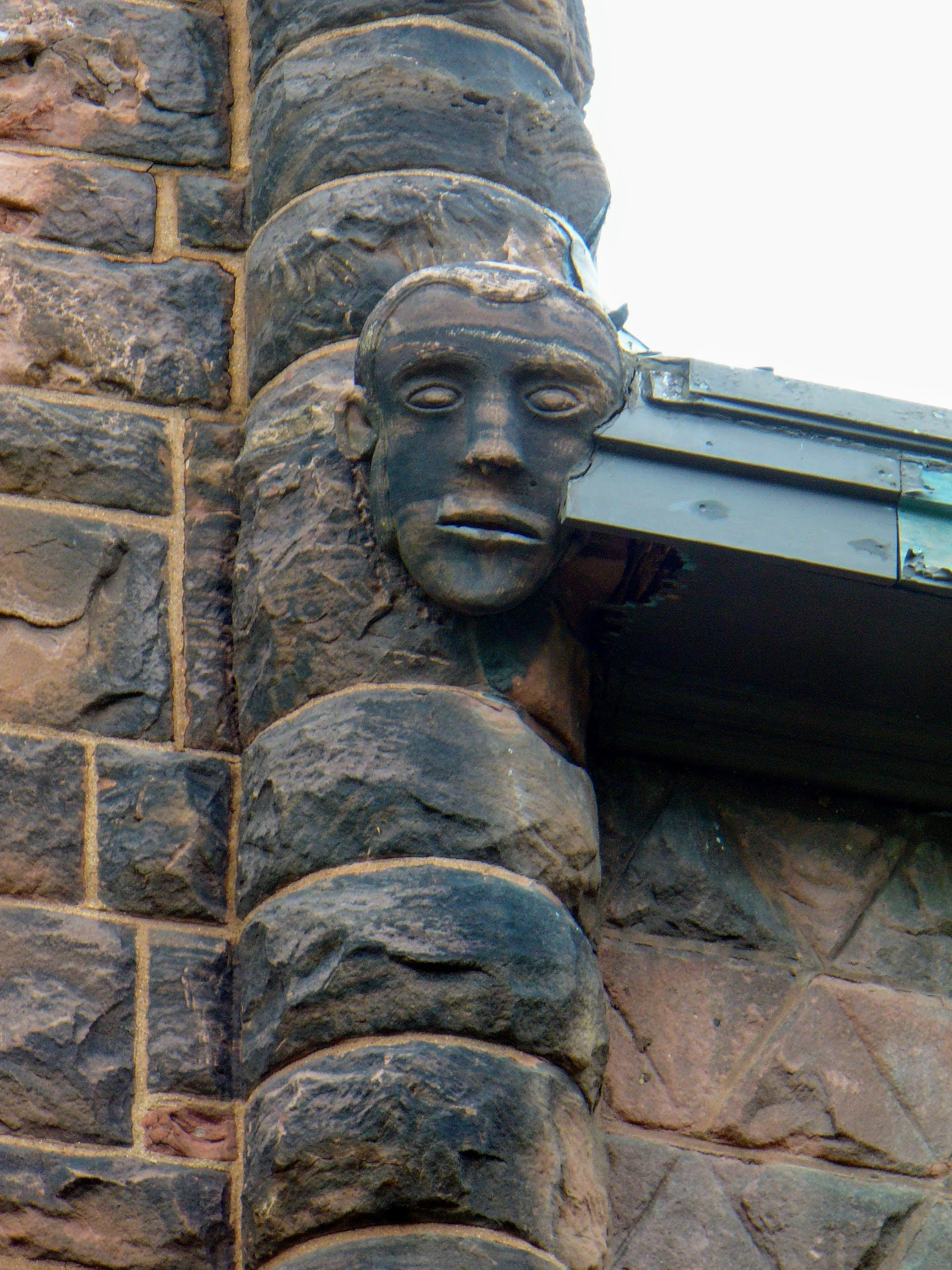
Detail on the side of the Music Education building

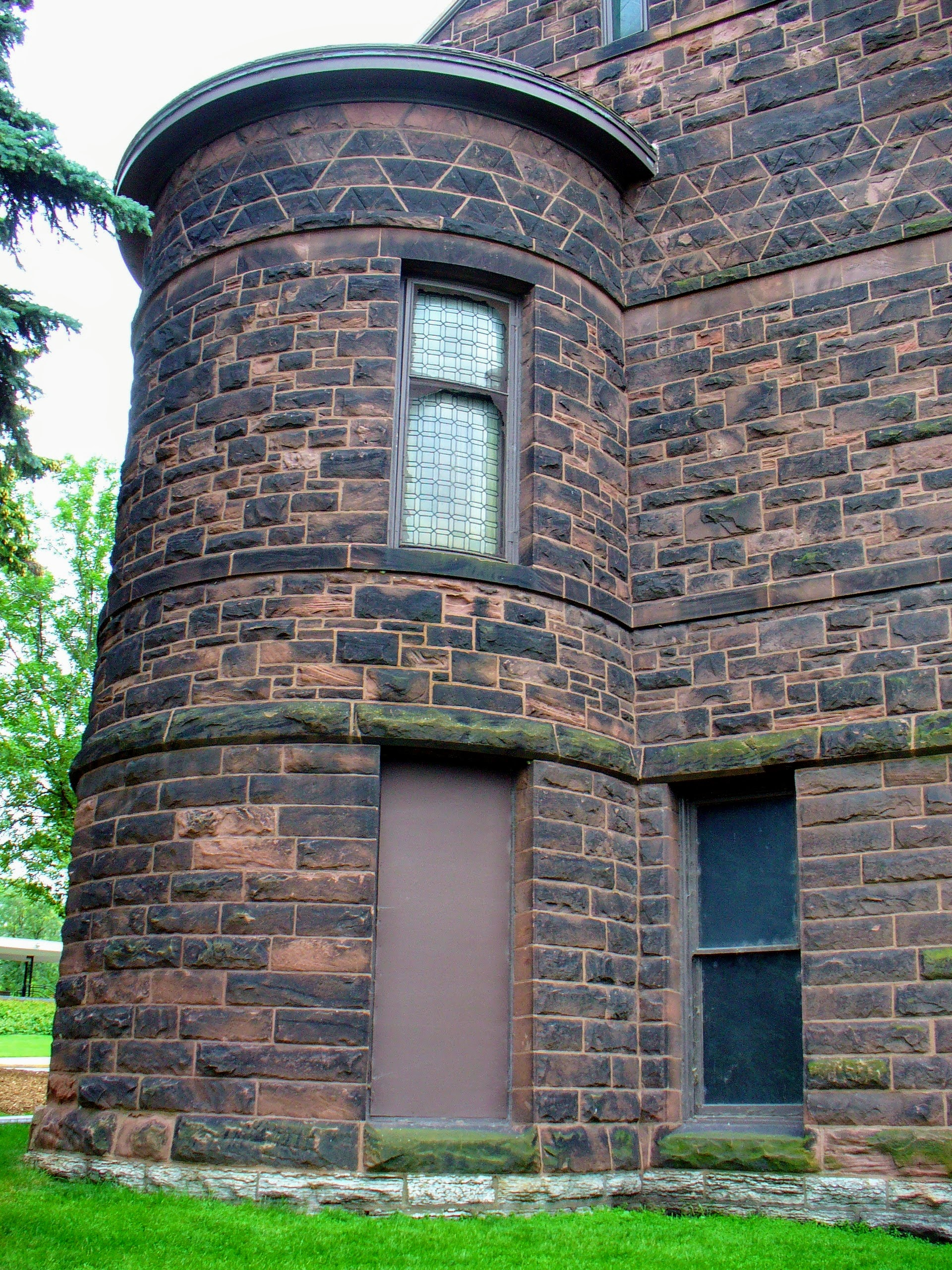
Backside of the Music Education building

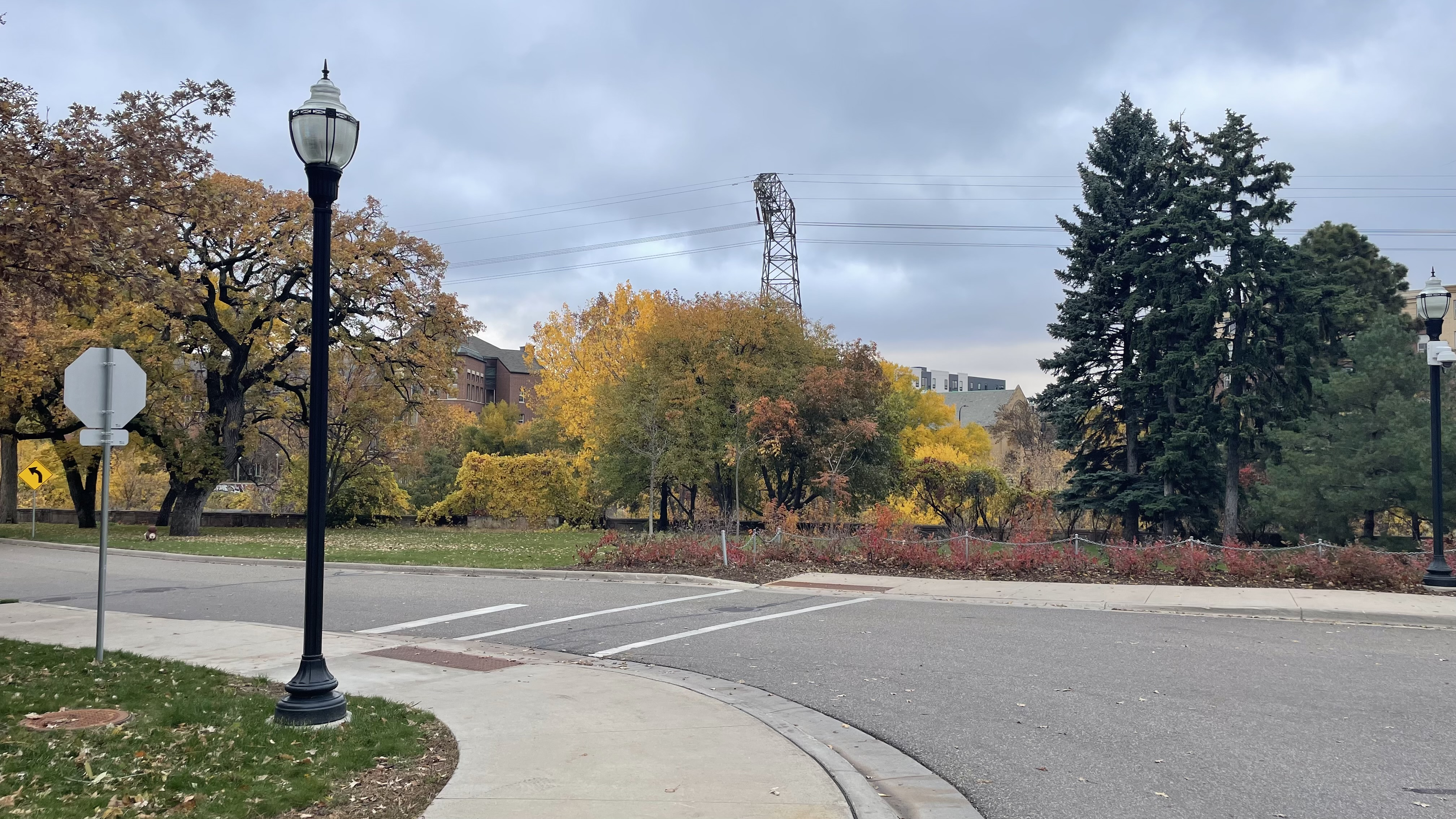
The site of the former Music Education building in October 2023

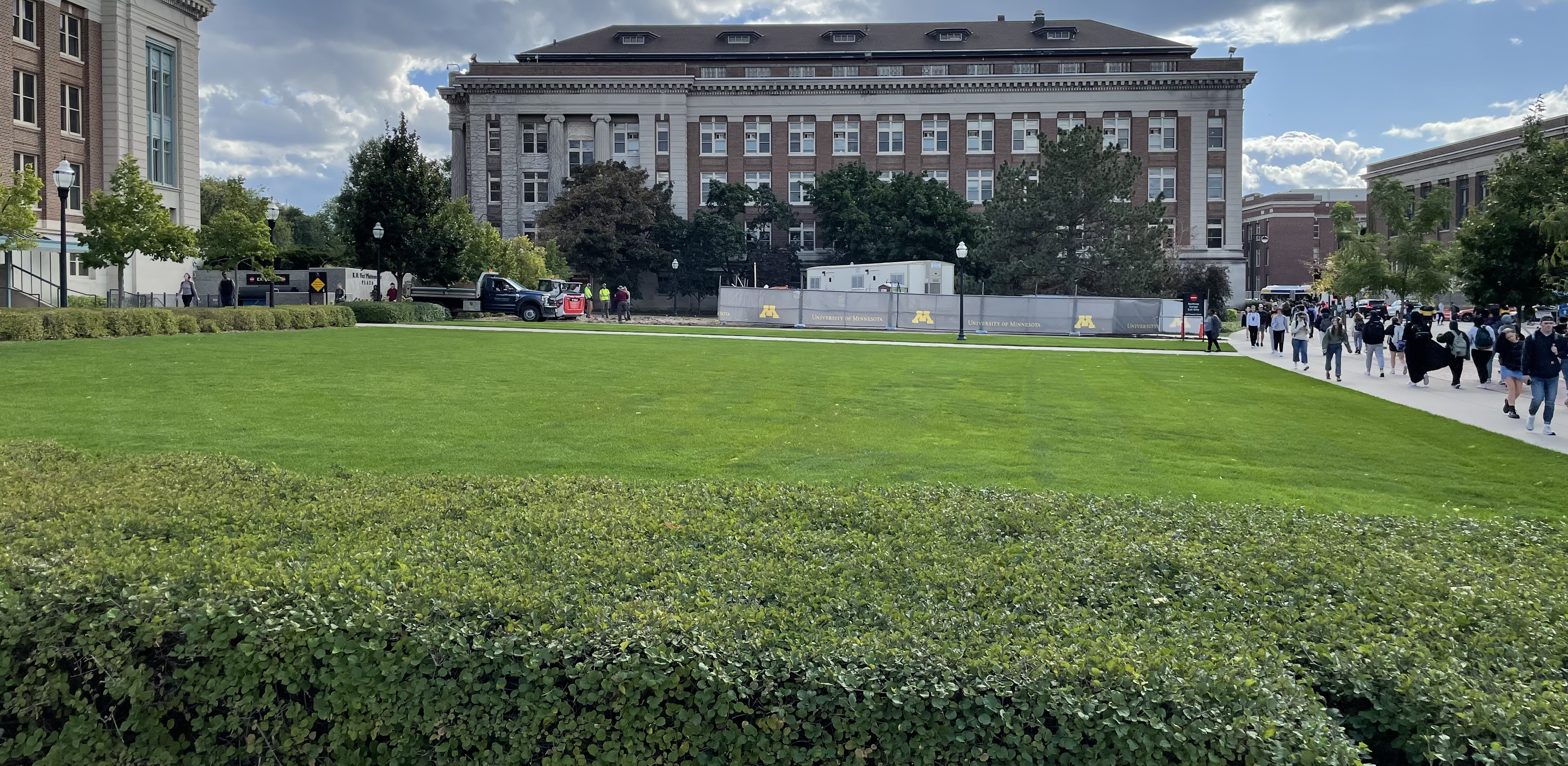
The former site of Wesbrook Hall in October 2023
