= Northrop Mall Historic District =

Historic district in Minnesota, United States

- U.S. National Register of Historic Places
- U.S. Historic district
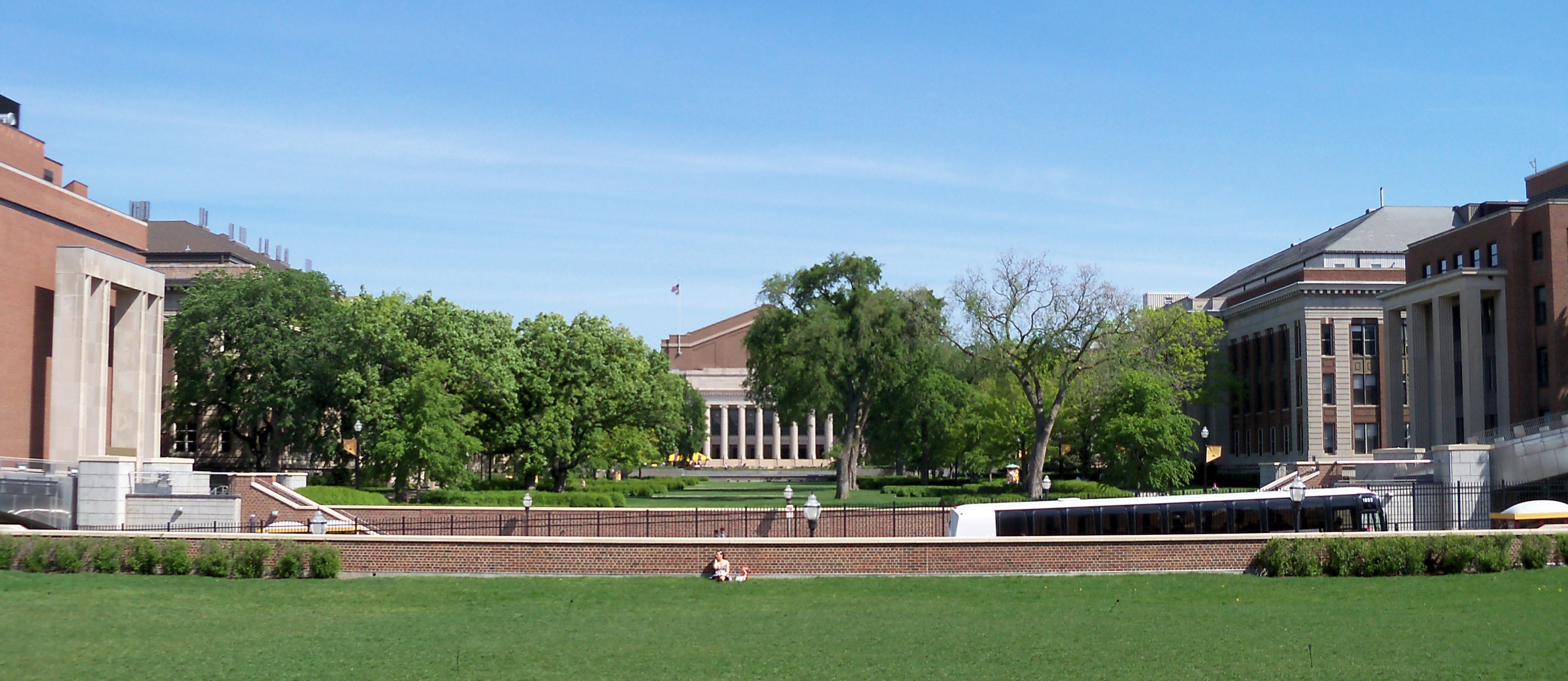
- Northrop Mall in 2011, facing north

- Location within Minnesota Location within the United States
- Location: University of Minnesota, Minneapolis, Minnesota
- Built: 1910-1971
- Architect: Cass Gilbert; Clarence H. Johnston Sr.; Morell and Nichols; Roger Martin; Magney, Tusler and Setter; Hammel Green and Abrahamson, Inc., et al
- Architectural style: City Beautiful movement, Beaux-Arts, Neoclassical, Stripped Classical, Streamline Moderne, Modern, Brutalism
- NRHP reference No.: 100001973
- Added to NRHP: January 19, 2018

The Northrop Mall Historic District is a historic district located at the University of Minnesota's east bank campus in Minneapolis, Minnesota. It covers buildings along Northrop Mall and in the surrounding area. The district was found eligible to be listed on the National Register of Historic Places in 2006, and was officially added in January 2018. Most of the buildings are connected by the Gopher Way; a tunnel and skyway network providing easy and direct enclosed pedestrian access. The district is roughly bounded by Pillsbury Drive SE to the north, East River Parkway to the west, Union Street SE to the east, and Delaware Street SE to the south. It is located directly south of the university's Old Campus Historic District.

The Mall was originally envisaged by architect Cass Gilbert in a 1908 plan. Funding for campus expansions that enabled construction of the Mall was largely credited to Minnesota Senator James Elwell.

== Lind Hall, 1911 ==
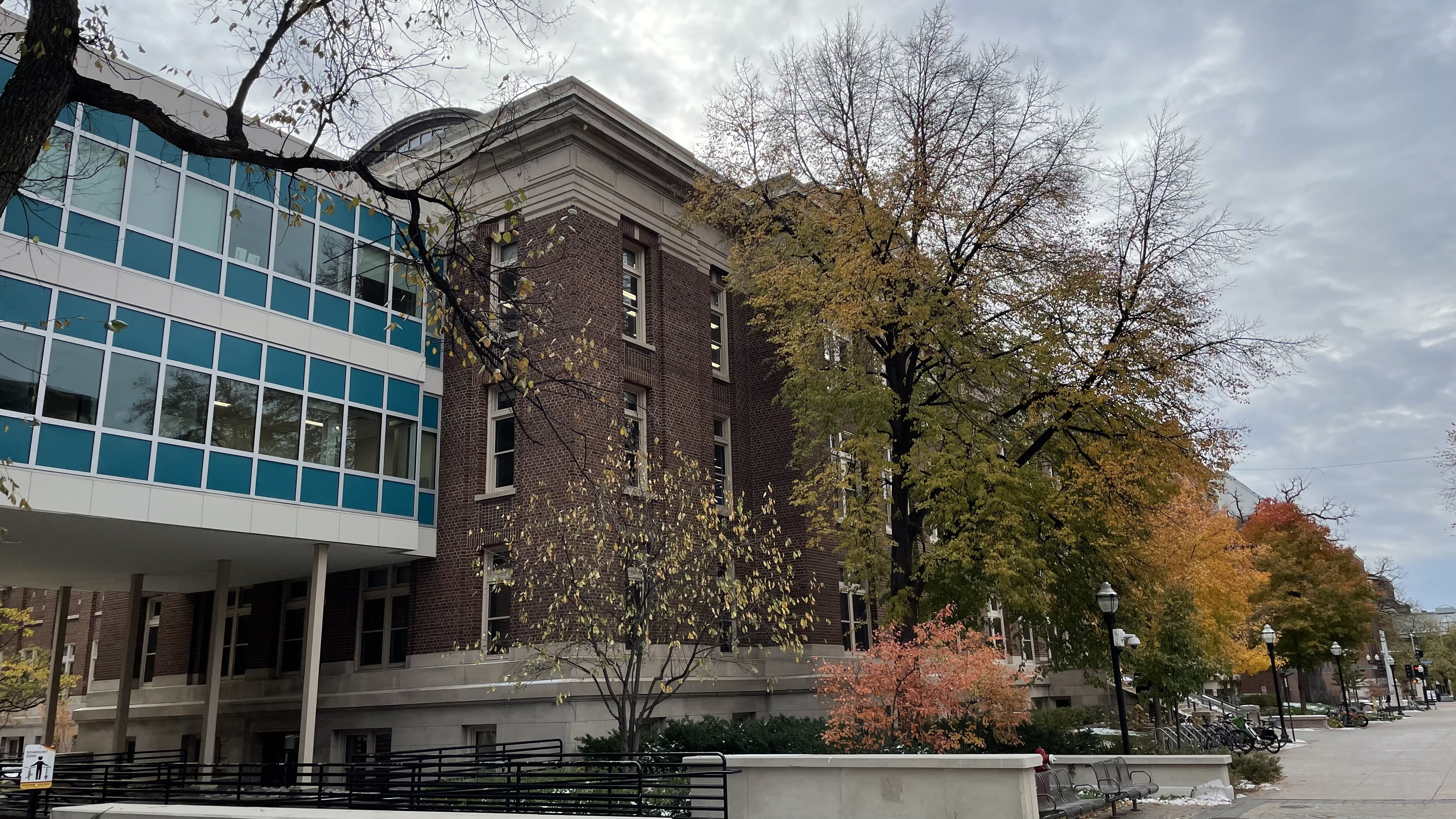
Lind Hall in 2023

Housed most of the university's English department until they moved to Pillsbury Hall. Currently, the building is home to the College of Science and Engineering, after a major renovation completed in 2023, providing 57,500 square feet of space for the Industrial and Systems Engineering department and additional space for the Computer Science & Engineering departments. Also inside the building is the Taylor Center, a study space which doubles as a computer lab, located in the former Engineering Library. The first floor contains a Starbucks restaurant.

== Smith Hall, 1913 ==
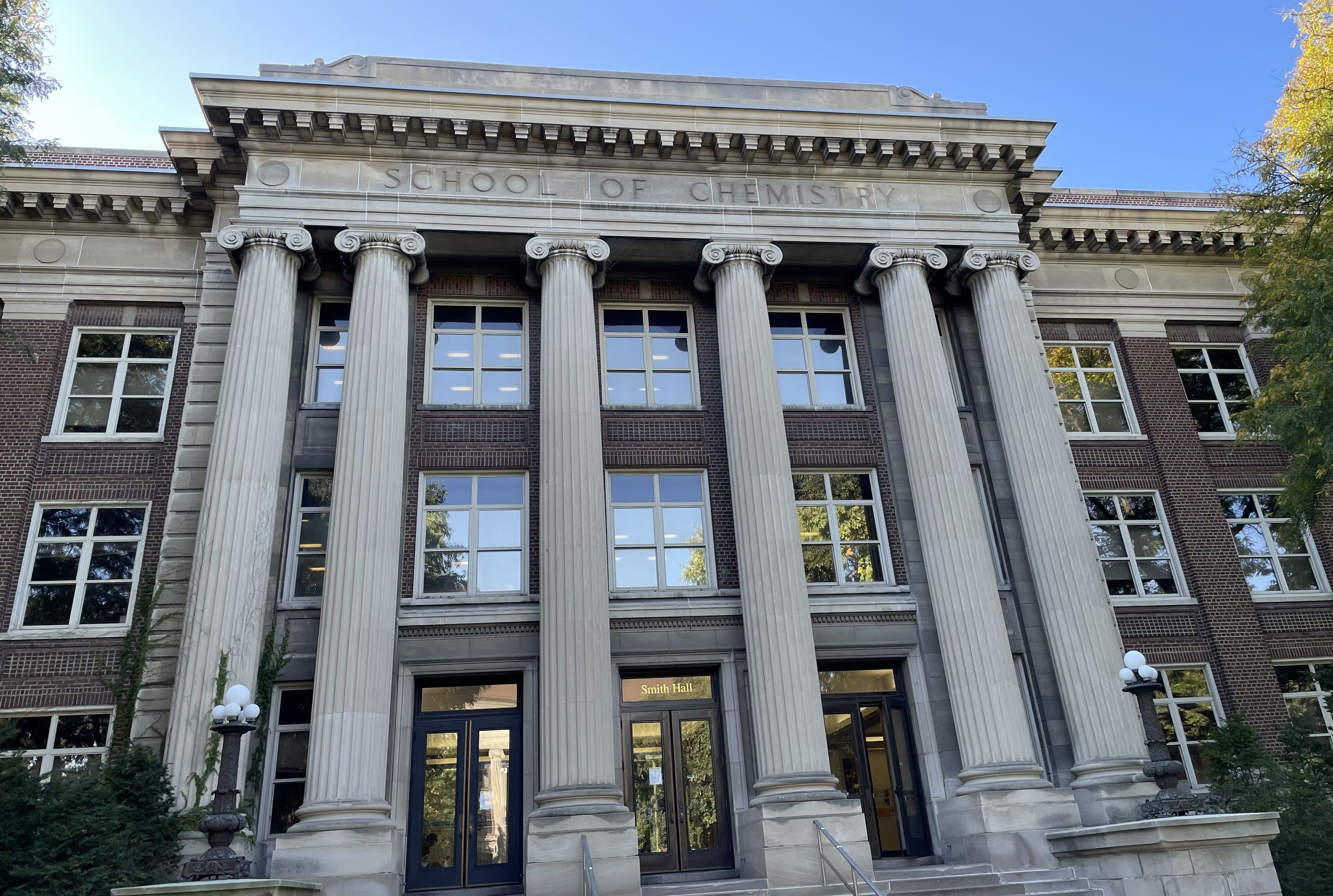
Smith Hall in 2023

One of the first University buildings in the country to be entirely devoted to Chemistry, and the first building to be constructed along what is now Northrop Mall, with work having begun in 1910. It was opened without its planned fourth floor and the west section still under construction. The building was fully completed in 1922 when funding was finally allocated for the remainder of the project. After a fire in the basement in 1959, the building required repair, and a full renovation later occurred in 1972. A second renovation, in 1987, added air conditioning. Currently, the building contains offices for the NSF Center for Sustainable Polymers.

== Appleby Hall, 1914 ==
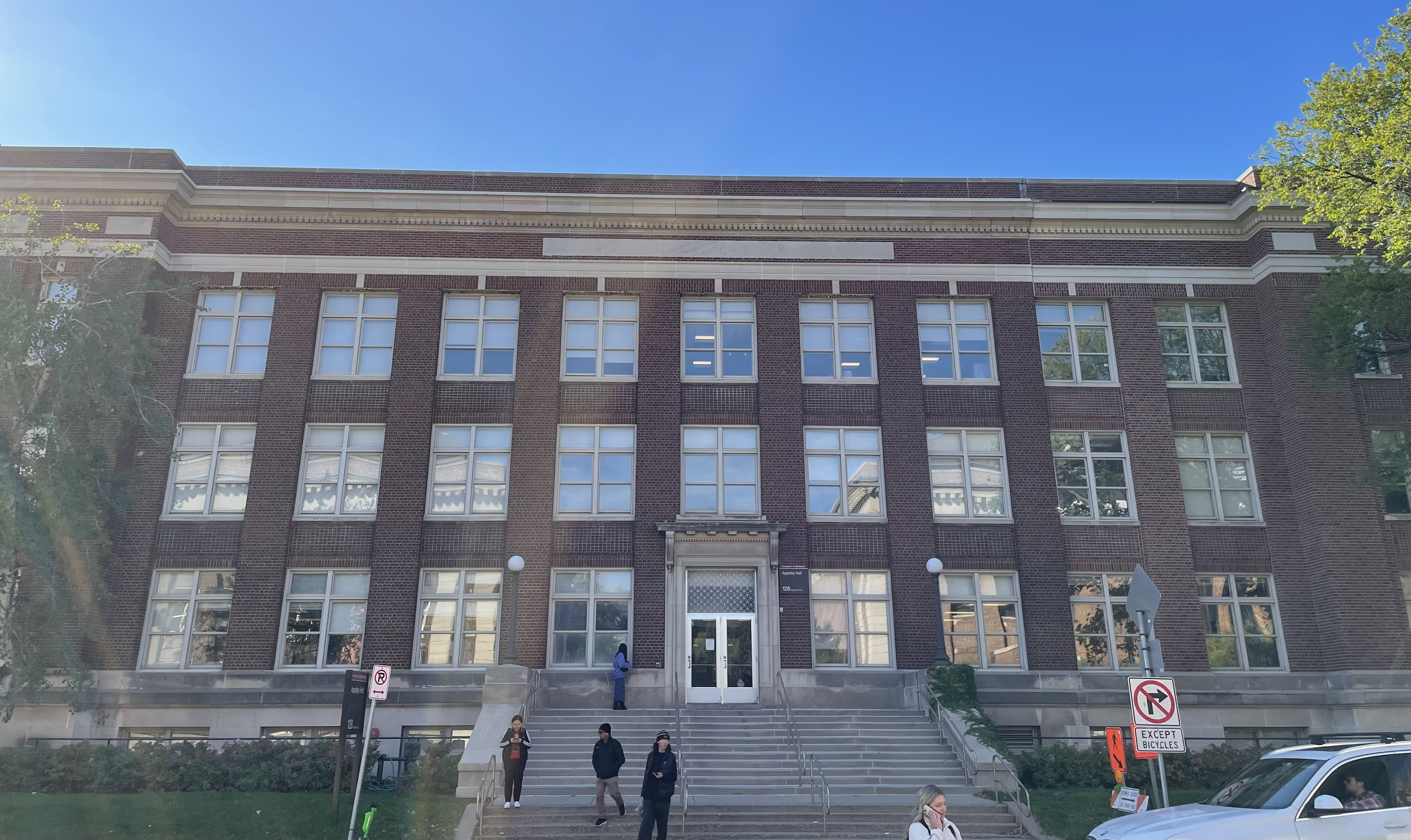
Appleby Hall in 2023

Formerly the location of both the university's General College and College of Pharmacy; the building houses several student services, such as the Multicultural Center for Academic Excellence, the Aurora Center for Advocacy and Education, and the Gender and Sexuality Center for Queer and Trans Life. In April 2023, a deceased person was found inside a classroom within the building. While the individual had no relation to the university, they were able to gain entry due to the building being designed for public use, and as such, not requiring ID access during public hours. The incident has heightened requests for more security around campus.

== Walter Library, 1924 ==
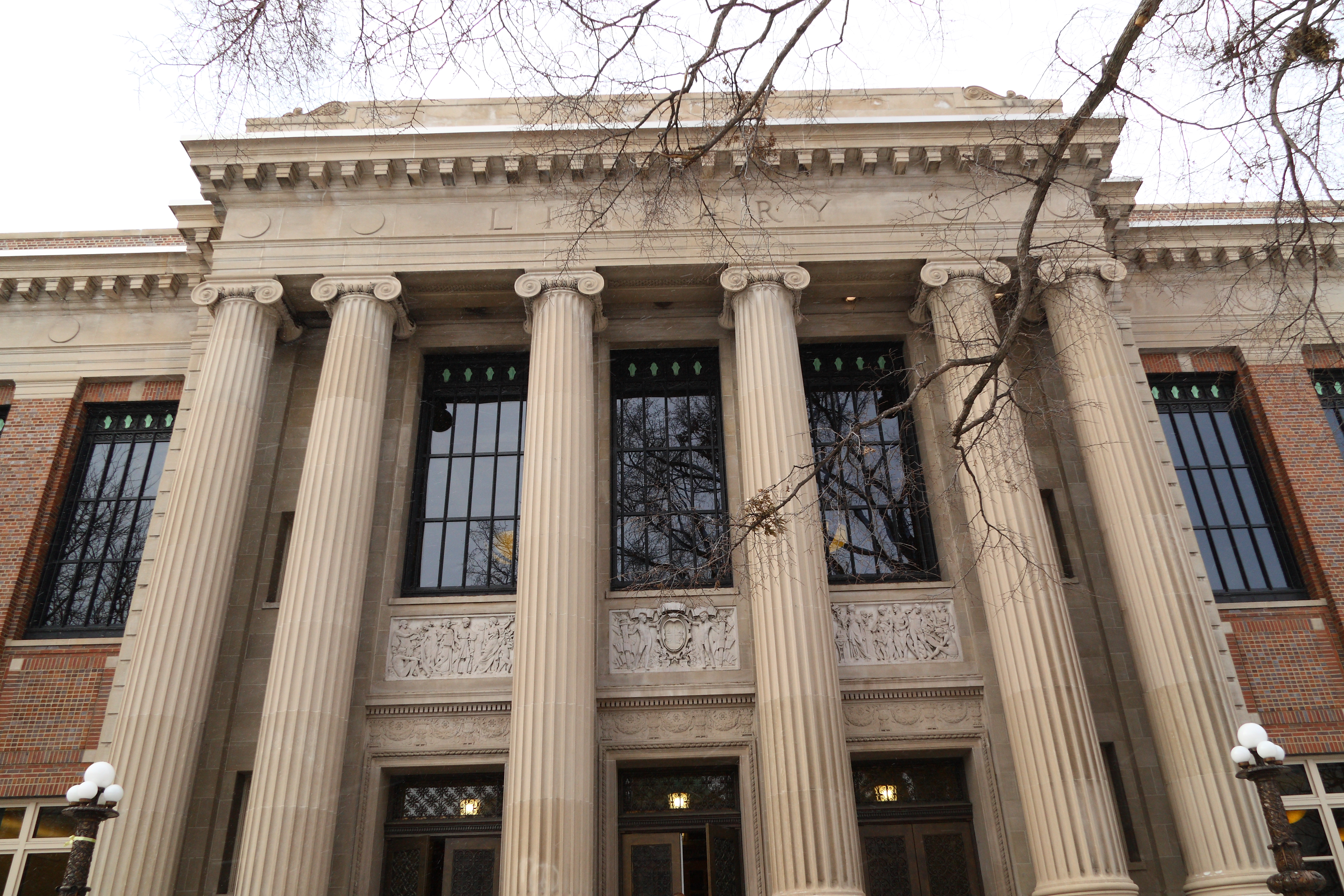
Walter Library in 2008

Architect: Clarence H. Johnston Sr.

Replaced Burton Hall as the main library of the university. In 1959, the building was named after Frank Keller Walter, the university librarian from 1921 to 1943. In 1999, construction began on a renovation, where it received technical upgrades and historical restorations, before reopening in 2002. Today, the building houses the College of Science and Engineering Library and Dean's Office, the Digital Technology and Media Centers, the Learning Resources Center, and the Minnesota Supercomputing Institute. It also features a small café in the basement, the Wise Owl Café, named in reference to the estimated 225 owl engravings in the library.

== Morrill Hall, 1925 ==
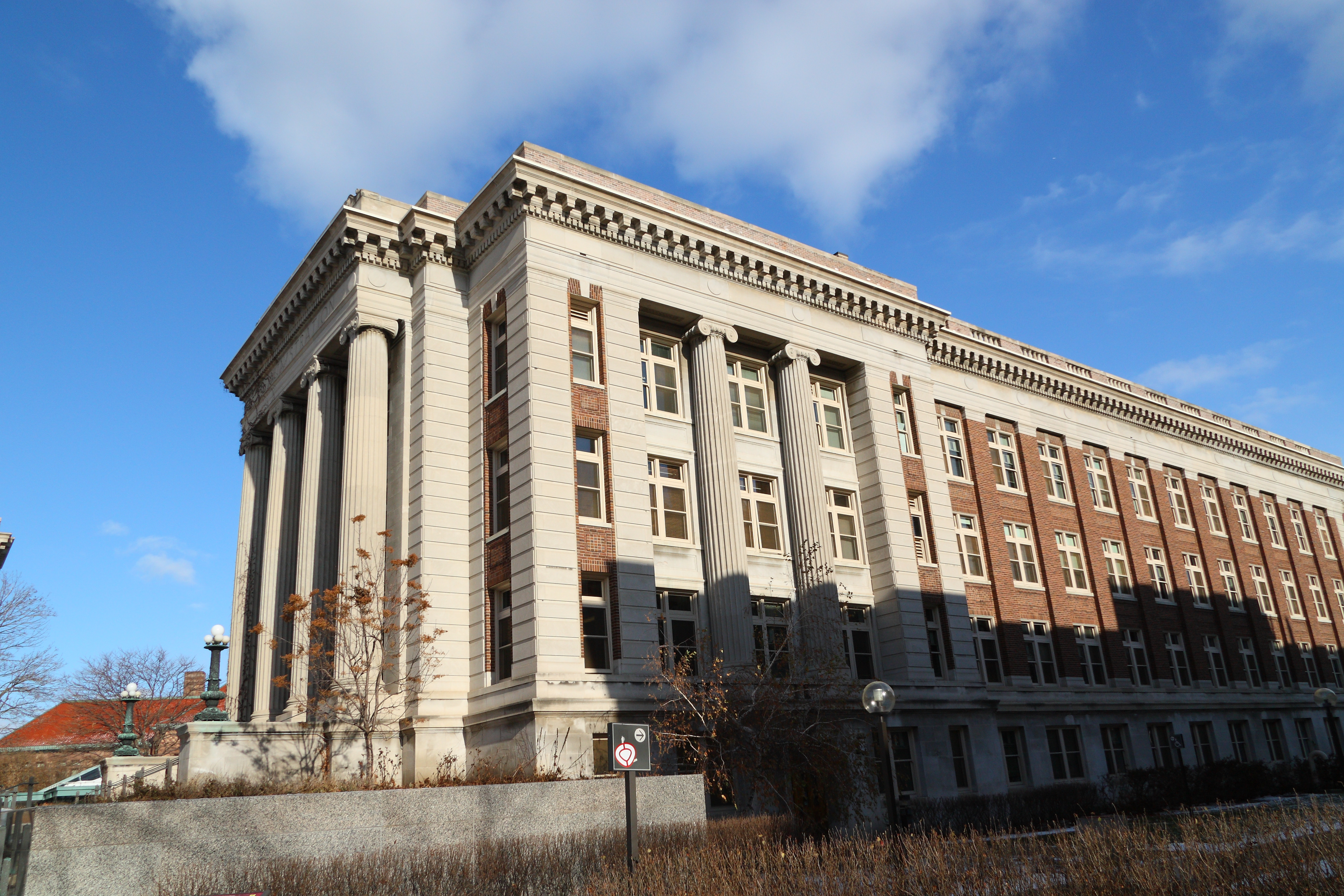
Morrill Hall in 2008

Built as an administration building and home to the Alumni Association until they moved to the McNamara Alumni Center.

On January 14, 1969, about seventy black students belonging to the Afro-American Action Committee occupied the building to protest the treatment of African Americans on campus and the absence of an African American studies department; the event becoming known as the "Morrill Hall Takeover". Entry to the building was blocked by the demonstrators, however the staff inside were allowed to leave. Though some office equipment was damaged and an angry white student attempted to force his way into the building, the protest was peaceful. Students Rose Mary Freeman, the president of the AAAC; Horace Huntley, the group's secretary; and Warren Tucker Jr., the leaders of the occupation, were indicted on charges of aggravated criminal damage to property, rioting, and unlawful assembly; the former two receiving a ninety-day suspended sentence and one-year probation, while the latter was acquitted. As a result of the event, many scholarships and programs for black students became available and the Department of Afro-American studies was created, becoming eventually known as the African American & African Studies department. In 2012, the Huntley House for African American Men, named after Horace Huntley, was opened by the university.

On October 21, 2024, pro-Palestinian protesters organized by the university's Students for a Democratic Society chapter occupied the building by barricading themselves in. Property damage was reported and 11 arrests were made. An SDS representative claimed that the building was chosen due to its history with the previous Morrill Hall Takeover.

Currently, Morrill Hall houses the university's administrative offices, the Undergrad Education office, and the Office of Equity and Diversity. It is also the location of President Rebecca Miriam Cunningham's office. The building is undergoing a revamp to make it more accessible to students and faculty.

== Tate Hall, 1926 ==
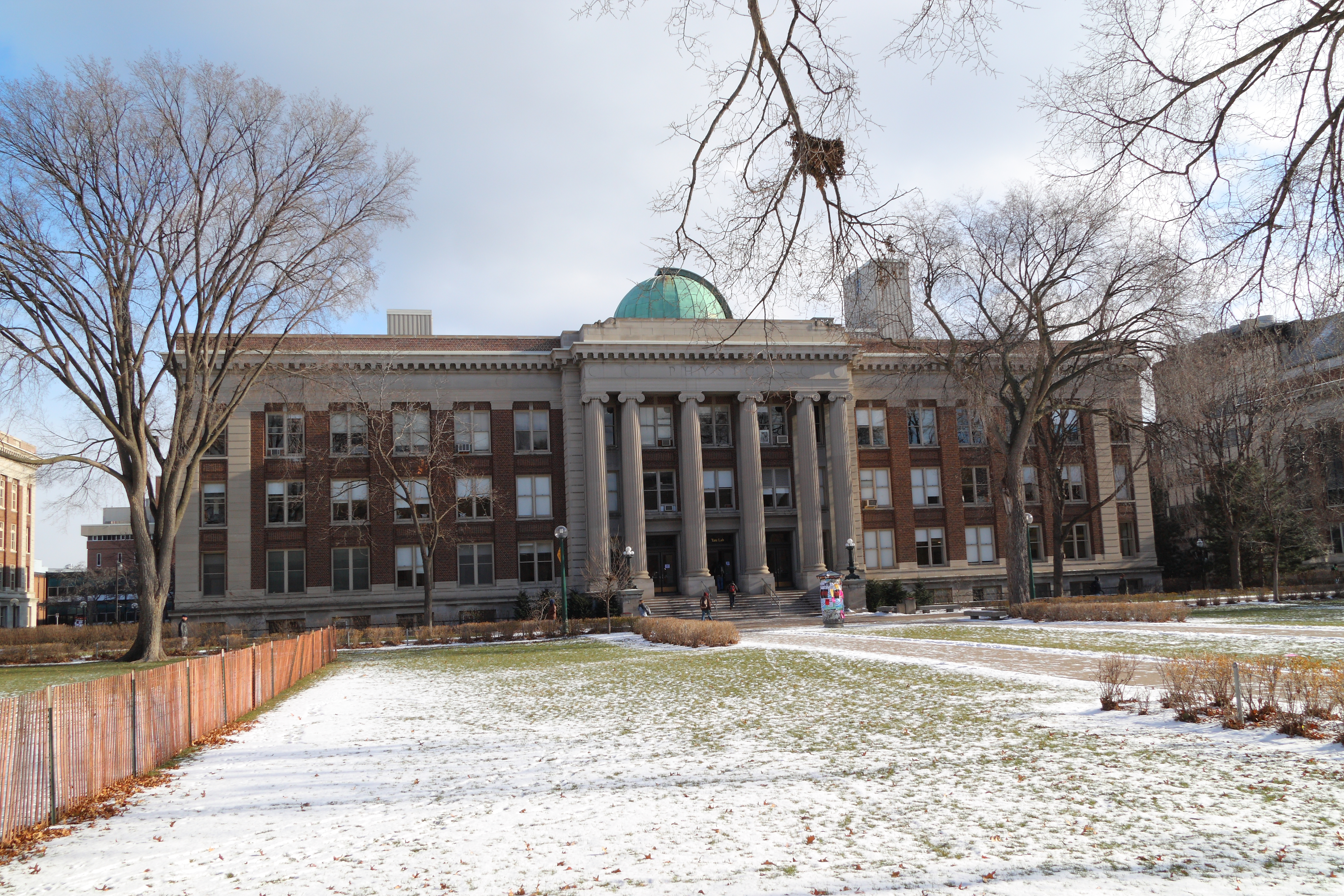
Tate Hall in 2008

Built as the Physics Building, it was later renamed to John T. Tate Hall, after John Torrence Tate Sr., a physics professor at the university. Having already had two renovations in the 1960s, the building underwent a third in 2017, at the cost of 92.5 million dollars. A significant portion of the interior was replaced, labs considered to be obsolete were turned into flexible spaces, and a large auditorium was constructed. The building currently houses the Department of Earth and Environmental Sciences, and the School of Physics and Astronomy, including the Minnesota Institute for Astrophysics and the William I. Fine Theoretical Physics Institute. Tate also contains a historic observatory with a 10.5 inch refracting telescope.

== Fraser Hall, 1928 ==
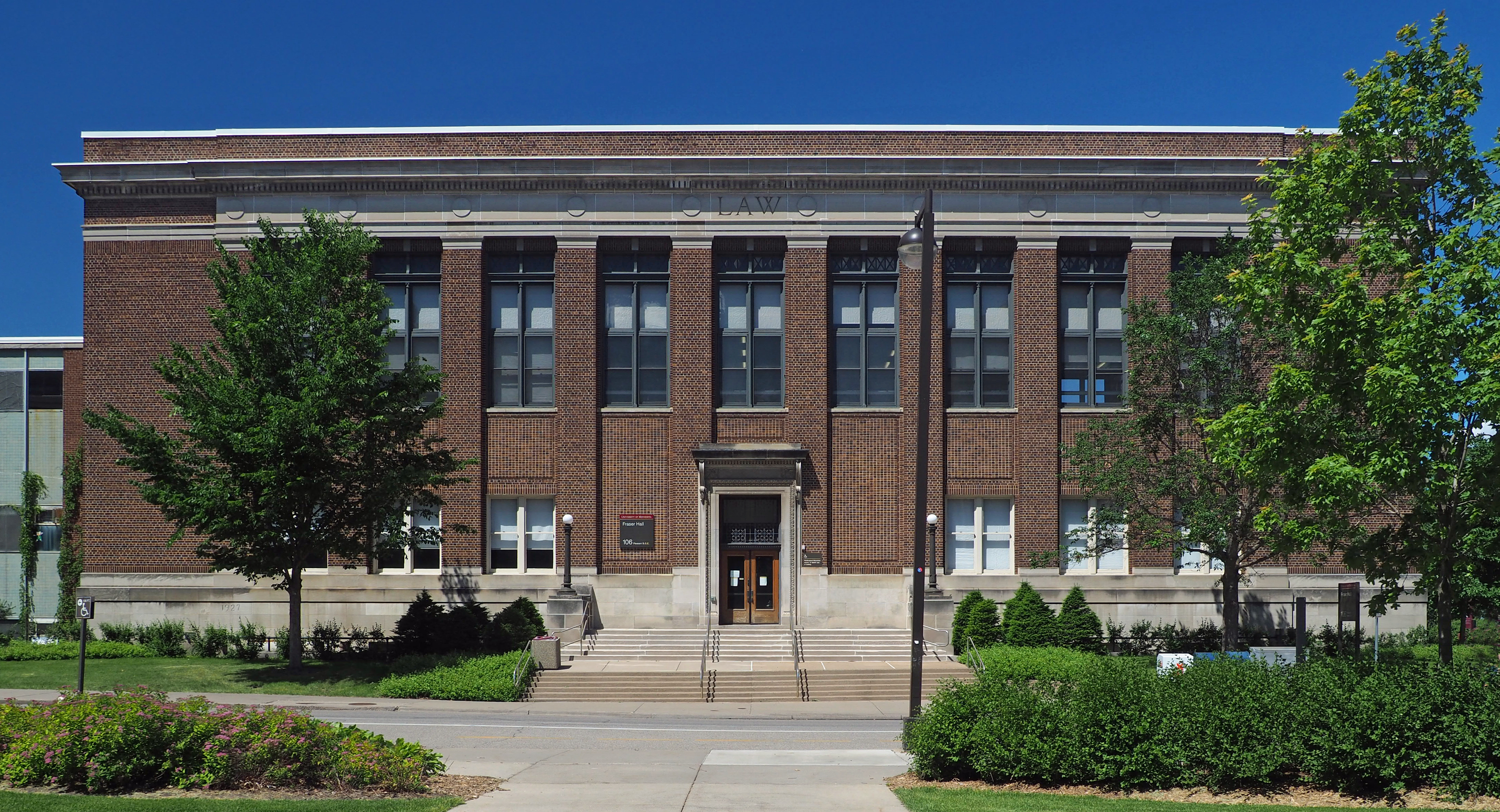
Fraser Hall in 2020

Built to replace Pattee Hall as the home of the university's Law School at the request of its third dean Everett Fraser—after whom the building was named—as he believed Pattee's classrooms were inadequate and its library too flammable. The Law School remained at Fraser Hall for 50 years until it moved to Mondale Hall, after which Fraser became a multi-purpose building. It was expanded once in the 1950s but received no structural upgrades for almost 70 years afterwards, resulting in the approval of a $144.7 million expansion by the State Legislature in 2023. The state's grant covered two-thirds of the cost, while the remaining third is set to be paid by the College of Science and Engineering over the course of 20 years. Construction began in September of that year. Plans included removing the original expansion, while adding 18 new chemistry labs, collaboration spaces, and general-purpose classrooms. The building fully reopened in October of 2025.

== Northrop Auditorium, 1929 ==
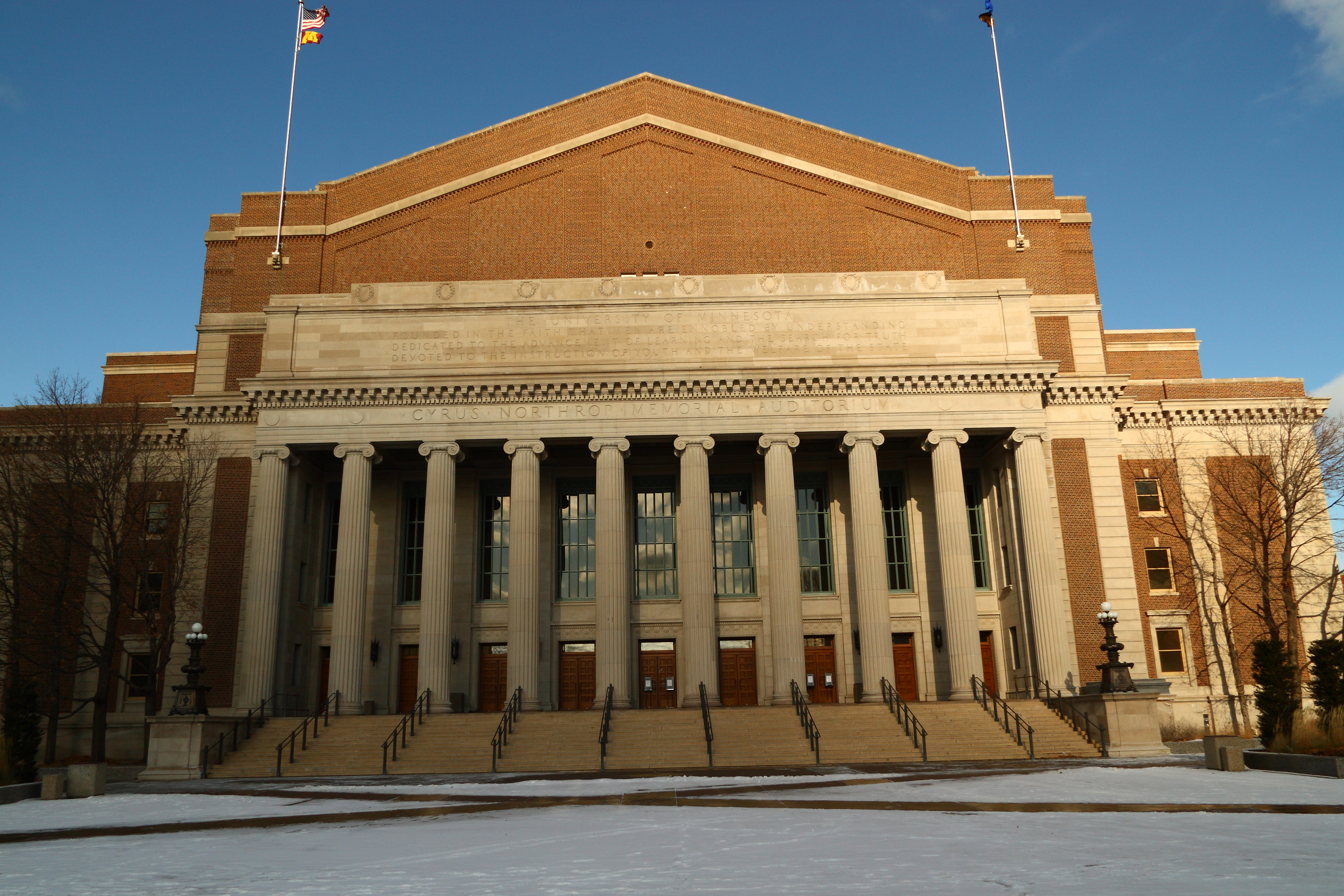
Northrop Auditorium in 2008

Architect: Clarence H. Johnston Sr.

Conceptualized as far back as 1908, it was built as part of a major University expansion project and was designed to host the entire 1929 student population. The auditorium was dedicated to honor Cyrus Northrop, the second president of the university, and veterans who served in World War I. Northrop's opening ceremonies included performances by the Minnesota Orchestra, the Boston Symphony, and the "Alumni and State Program". A pipe organ, the largest in the Upper Midwest, was installed in 1936 but later removed in 2011, during an extensive renovation of the building which reduced seating, but improved sight lines and acoustics in the main theater, and saw a second theater space added on the fourth floor. The building reopened in 2014 and the pipe organ was reinstalled three years after, in 2017.

In January 2023, a parapet wall failure caused a portion of the roof to collapse on the east side of the building. No injuries were reported and the theaters did not sustain any damage. The building reopened three weeks later, though repairs lasted through the year and were completed by January 2024.

== Vincent Hall, 1938 ==
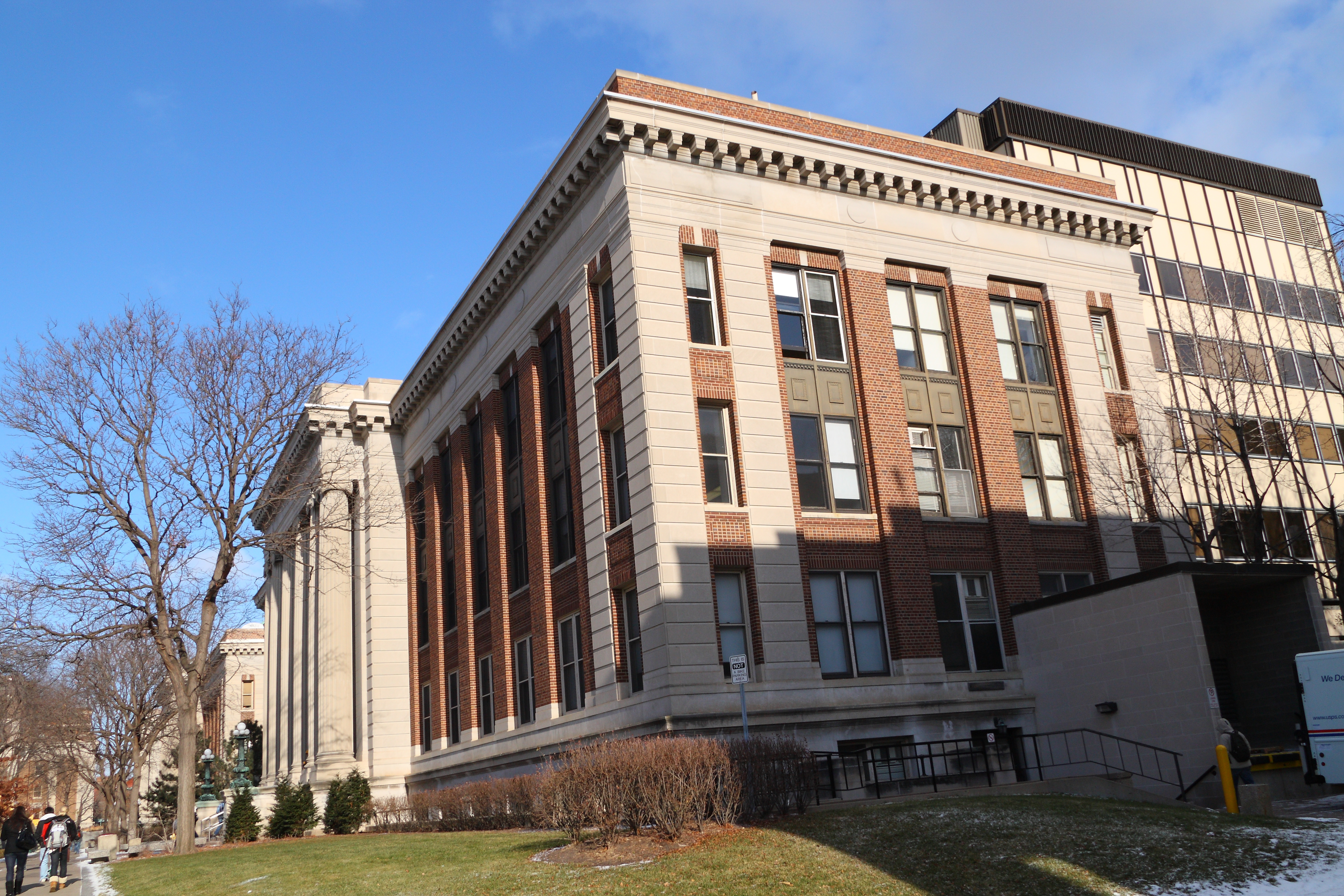
Vincent Hall in 2008

Named after George Edgar Vincent, the third president of the university, and at one time housed parts of the university's English and Mortuary Science departments. In 1960, a renovation project connected Vincent to the nearby Murphy Hall, directly behind it. A later renovation project, carried out by Loeffler Construction and Consulting, upgraded floors, interior finishes, and general accessibility, along with replacing the windows and adding several fixed tables within classrooms. The building currently contains the School of Mathematics and its Library, though the latter is set to close in the summer of 2025.

== Murphy Hall, 1940 ==
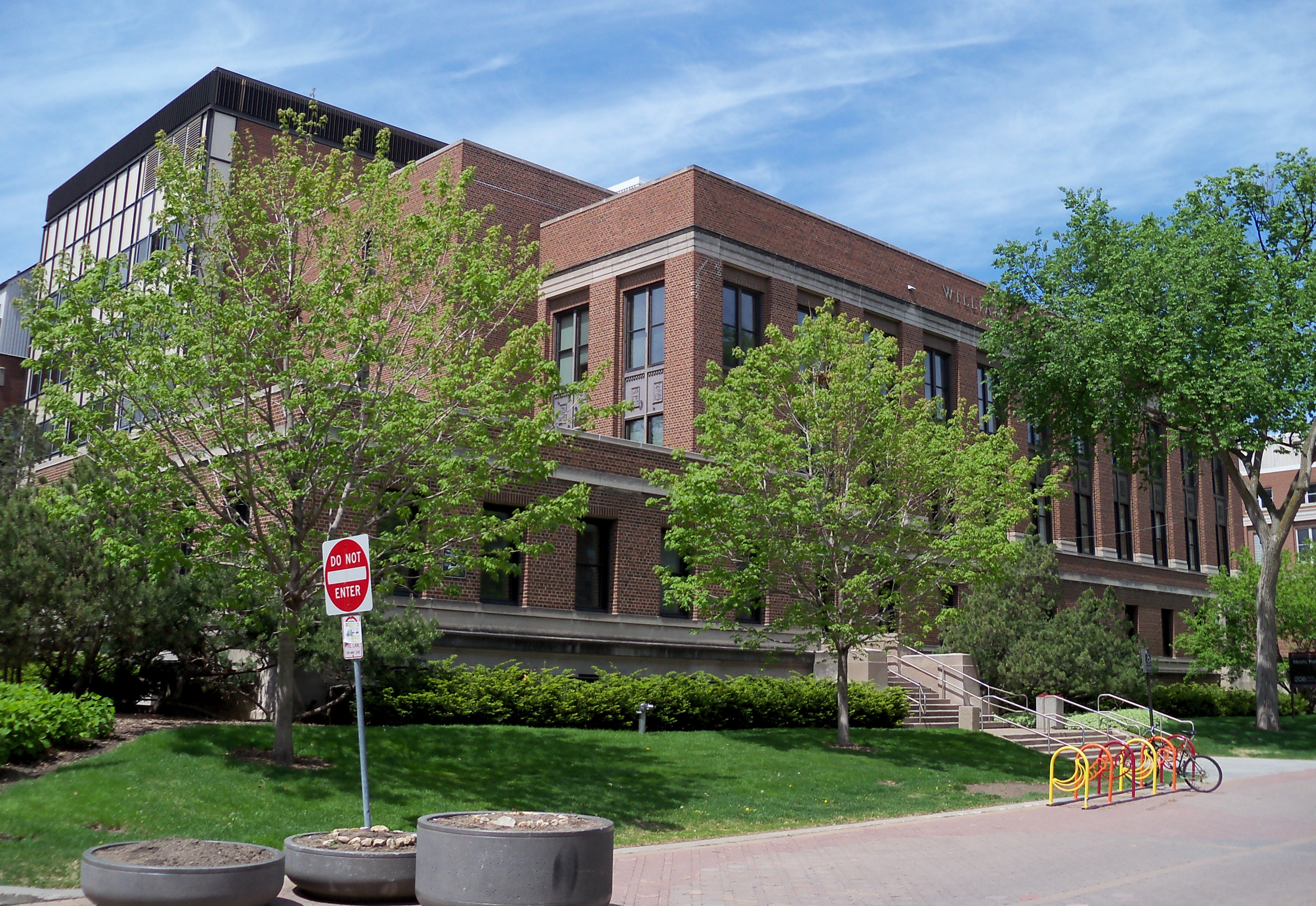
Murphy Hall in 2010

The home of the Hubbard School of Journalism and Mass Communication. When a connection between Murphy and Vincent Halls was built, several offices within Murphy were transferred to the Math Department. The building began to fall into disrepair until it underwent a renovation in 1999, filling it with $1,000,000 worth of modern equipment, reclaiming the offices previously occupied by the Math Department, adding fire escapes to the Vincent Hall connection, and installing a sprinkler system. Additionally, several group work areas were constructed. The basement at one time contained a photography lab and offices for the Gopher yearbook, the Ski-U-Mah humor magazine, the Literacy Review, and the Minnesota Daily. The basement classrooms lacked walls, however, which students often found distracting, so proper separation was constructed during a 2023 renovation. Additionally, it now contains an upgraded space for the Sevareid Journalism Library, and studios for podcasts and broadcasting.

== Coffman Memorial Union, 1940 ==
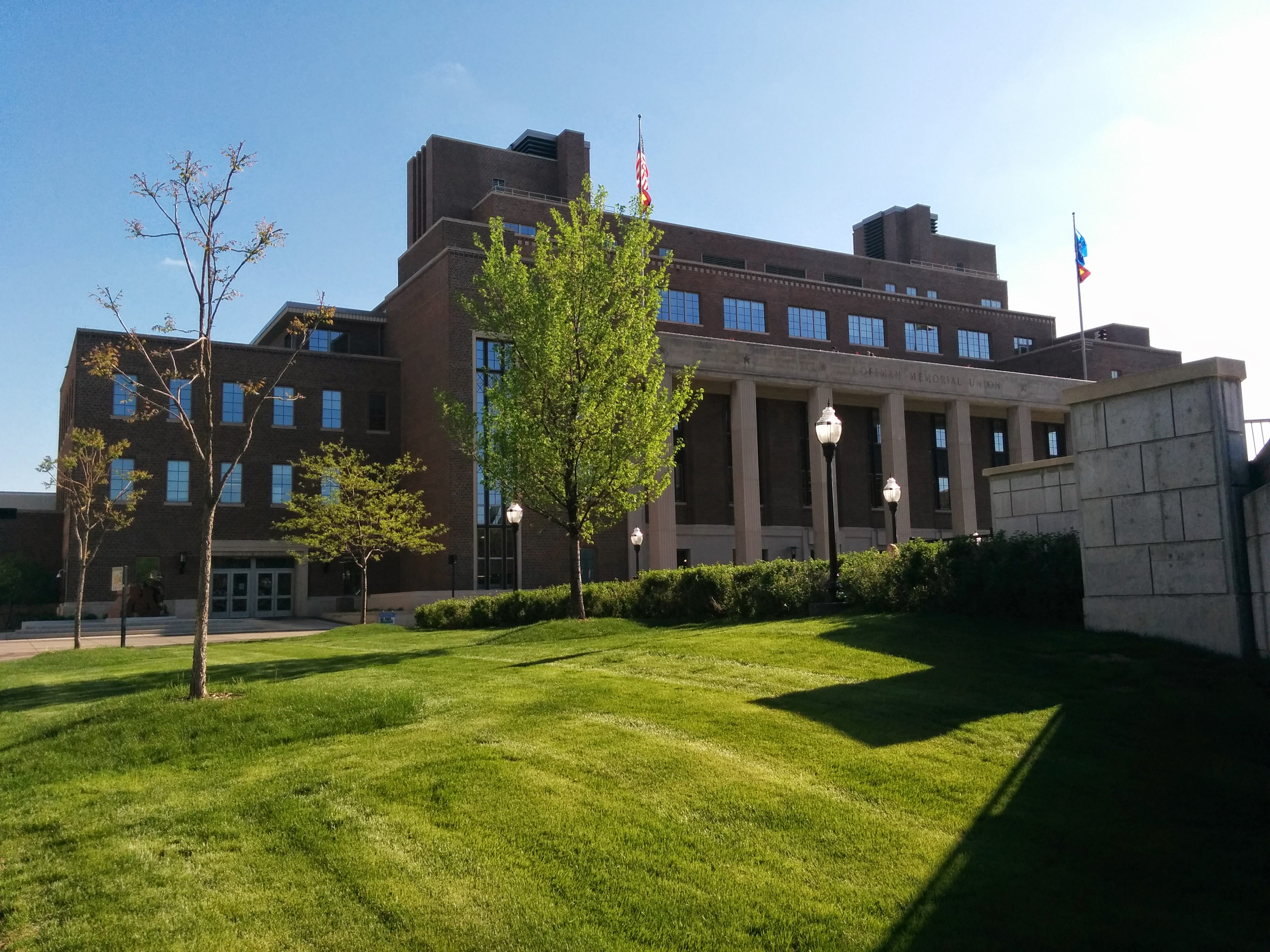
Coffman Memorial Union in 2015

Architect: Clarence H. Johnston Jr.

Named after Lotus D. Coffman, the fifth president of the university, and originally designed to accommodate 14,000 students. Beginning in May 1970 and lasting for a month, students protesting against the United States' involvement in the Vietnam War occupied the building for 24 hours a day. In 1972, after President Richard Nixon announced a plan to blockade and mine North Vietnam's harbors, the most significant demonstrations took place around campus, including a rally at Coffman during which former United States Senator, from Minnesota, Eugene McCarthy spoke.

In 1976, a renovation was completed, though it became highly criticized, as it removed large portions of the structure's interior Streamline Moderne design, changed the color scheme, and made it harder for large groups to congregate in the building, as a direct response to the protests. A third of the back terrace was covered in glass, extending the main lounge which was renamed as the Ski-U-Mah lounge, though the new glass was found to often heat up the room during the summer and not maintain heat during the winter. Overall, the remodel allowed the building to accommodate 42,000 students.

In 1999, the building underwent a second, major renovation, with construction lasting until 2003. This renovation reversed most of the changes made in the 1976 remodel and restored much of the original building, along with constructing a new 1,900 car underground parking garage behind the structure. Additionally, the renovation saw the opening of an expansion connected to the basement of the main structure; a building known as the cube, which contains seating, a post office, an entryway to the campus bookstore, a convenience store, and a Starbucks coffee shop.

In 2013, a large statue of the university's mascot, Goldy Gopher, was unveiled in front of Coffman. The statue has since become a popular spot for students to take pictures at.

In 2019, a university task force suggested renaming the building, due to Lotus Coffman's racist and anti-Semitic policies.

== Akerman Hall, 1948 ==
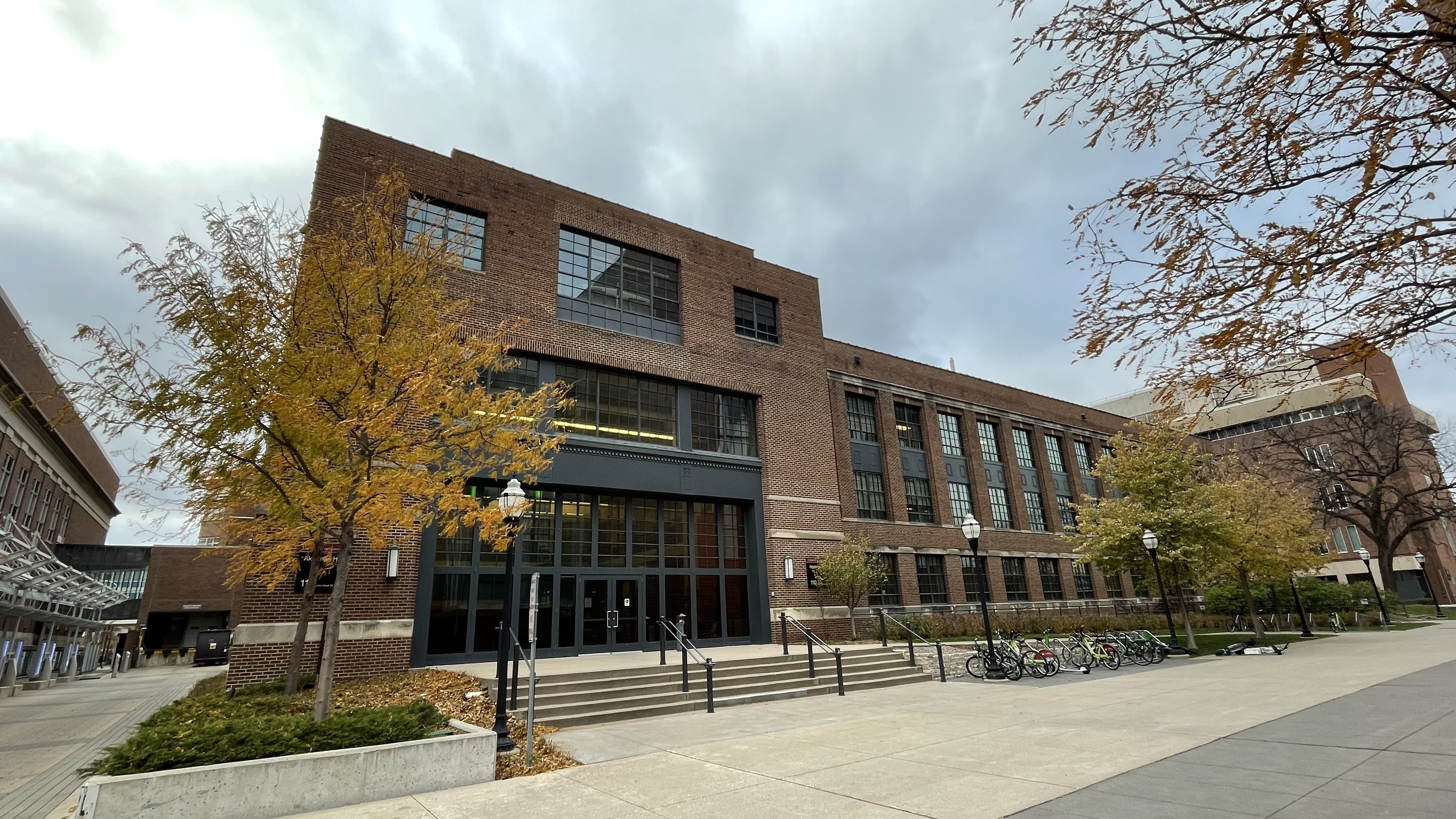
Akerman Hall in 2023

Home to the Aerospace Engineering Department and built to connect to the Mechanical Engineering building, which was constructed at the same time. In 1985, a large space within the building, known as "The Hangar" due to it originally housing aircraft, was renovated, in which temporary laboratory spaces were added and a hallway was constructed that led to the building's driveway. The Aerospace Engineering Department later grew unhappy with these changes and for several years pushed for the space to be renovated again. In 2010, at the cost of $5.3 million, the building's fire safety systems were upgraded. Concurrently, the Hangar was renovated by BWBR Architects Incorporated for $7.6 million. Though much of the original structure was retained and returned to its pre-1985 renovation layout, including removal of the hallway to Akerman's driveway, its sixteen feet tall steel hangar doors were replaced with a glazed curtain-wall entrance and both its ground floor and second floor mezzanine were repurposed to provide collaborative spaces for students. Additionally, in 2015, the Hangar was renamed to the Gary J. Balas atrium, after Gary Balas, an Aerospace Engineering professor at the university who died from cancer in November 2014.

== Mechanical Engineering, 1948 ==
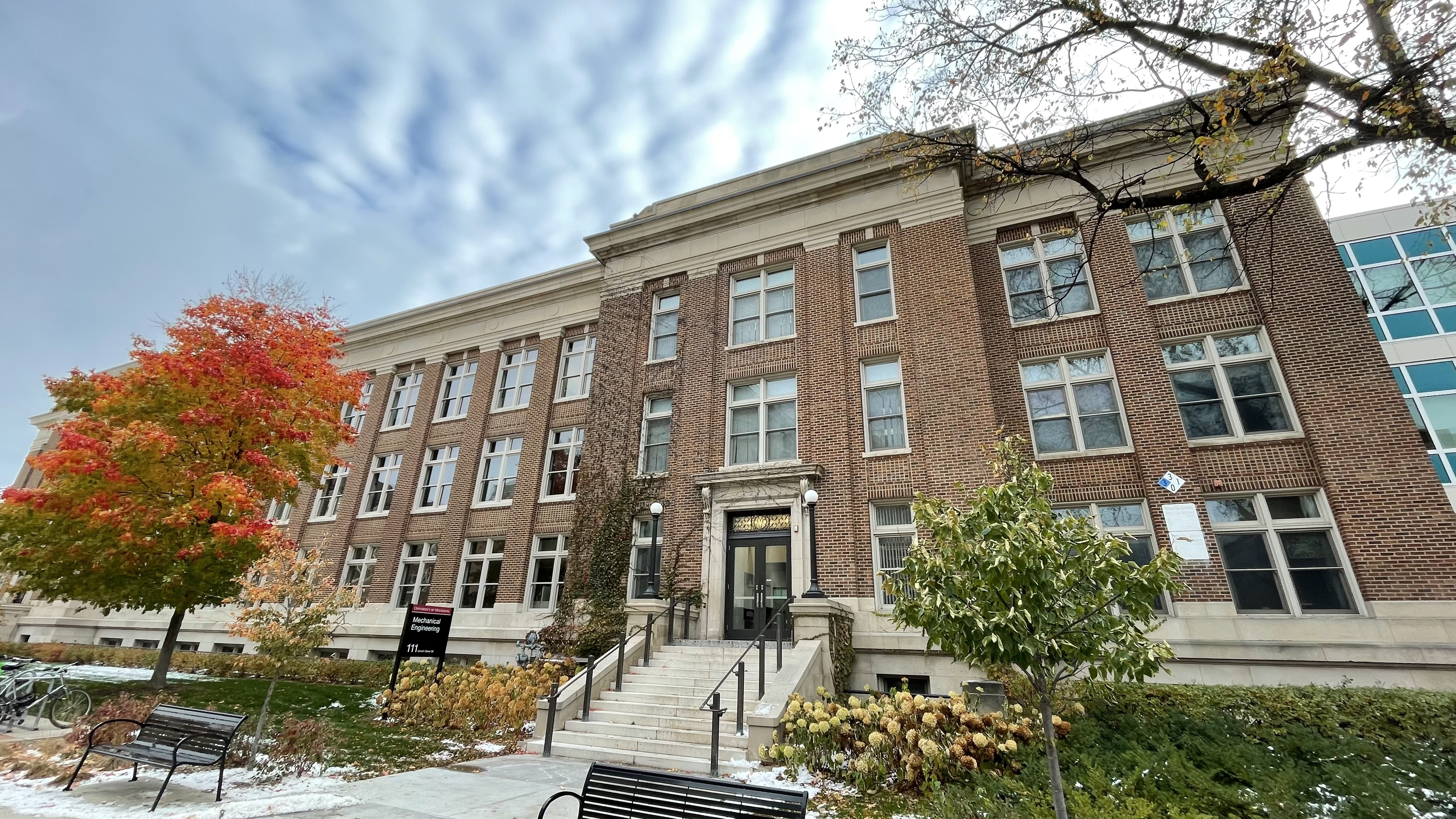
Mechanical Engineering in 2023

Built as a connecting structure to a previous 1923 building, it houses the Department of Mechanical Engineering, along with the Anderson Student Innovation Labs. The building was designed to connect to the next door Akerman Hall, which was constructed at the same time. While a major expansion, the south wing, was constructed in 2000 and opened in 2001, the original building was not upgraded for over 65 years. By the time renovation started in 2014, the original west and north wings had numerous code violations in its electrical systems, HVAC, restrooms, elevators, and windows; and a mercury spill had temporarily closed a teaching lab. The renovation brought many improvements, including new electrical services, elevators, and accessibility features. The north wing received a mechanical penthouse with new piping and air handling units, while the building's windows were replaced.

In 2017, a 78 year old Mechanical Engineering professor, Barney Klamecki, was found dead within the building, appearing to have died of natural causes, according to the Hennepin County Medical Examiner.

In 2019, a minor chemical fire broke out at the Mechanical Engineering building, which the Minneapolis Fire Department quickly responded to and put out. Fears of the chemical's fumes caused the building to temporarily close, though it reopened later that day after it had been extensively vented.

== Johnston Hall, 1950 ==
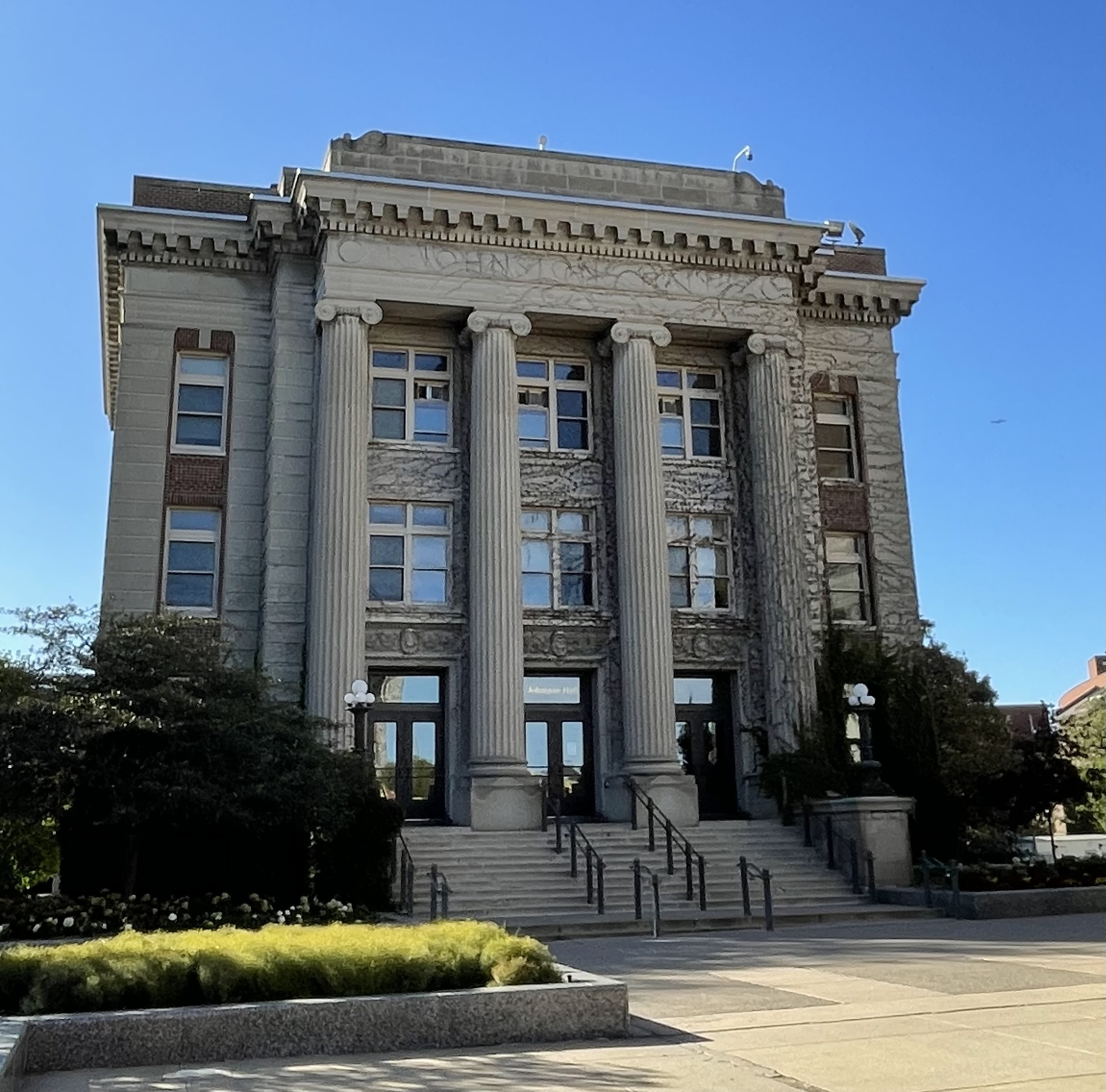
Johnston Hall in 2023

Named after John Black Johnston, professor of Comparative Neurology from 1907 to 1914, and professor and dean of the College of Science, Literature and the Arts from 1914 to 1937. It currently houses the College of Liberal Arts' administrative offices and student advising center, along with the Graduate School.

== Ford Hall, 1951 ==
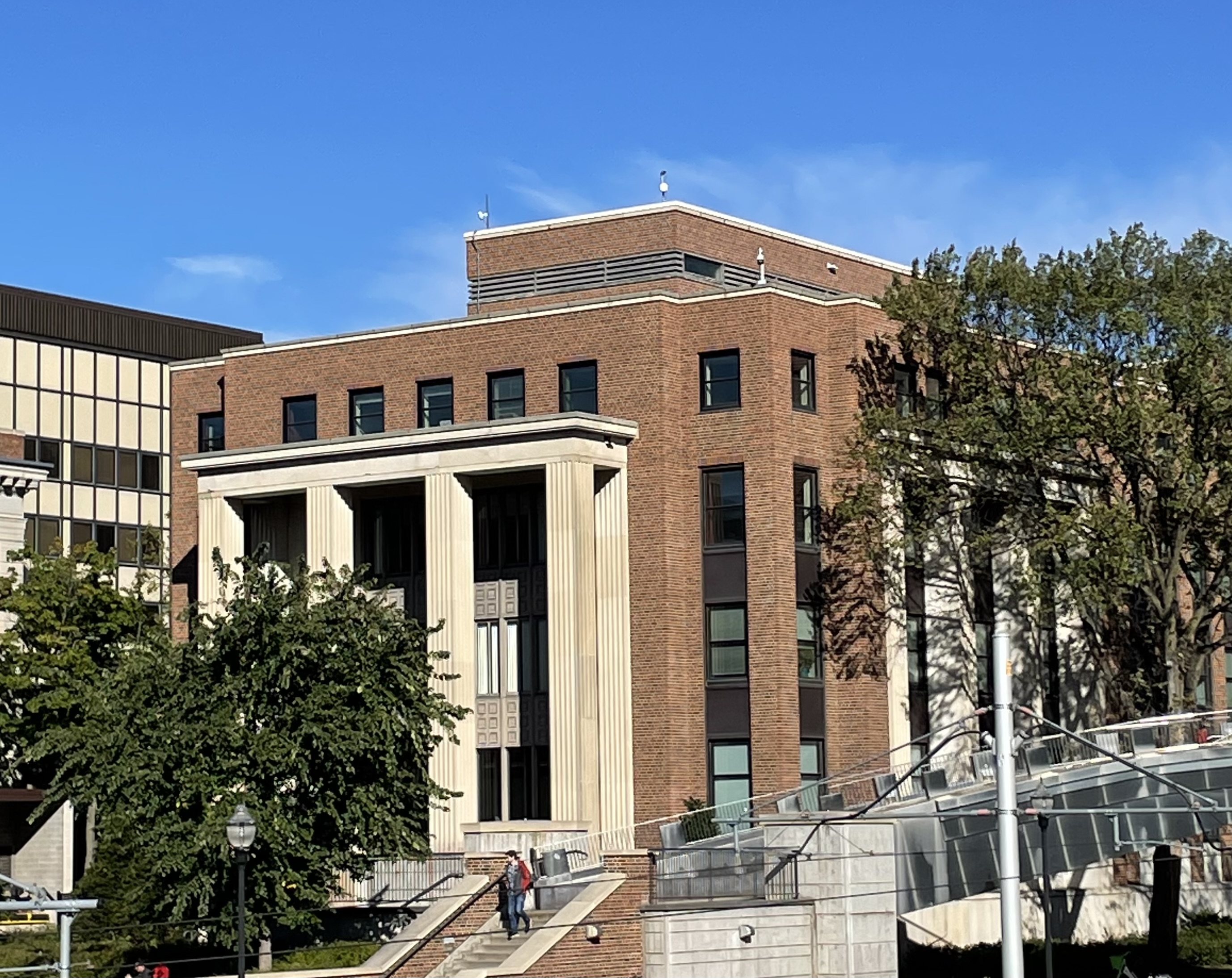
Ford Hall in 2023

Replaced a previous two-story structure and named after Guy Stanton Ford, the sixth president of the university. The building currently houses the Department of Speech Communication, the Department of Gender, Women, and Sexuality Studies, and the School of Statistics.

== Vincent Murphy Courtyard, 1968 ==
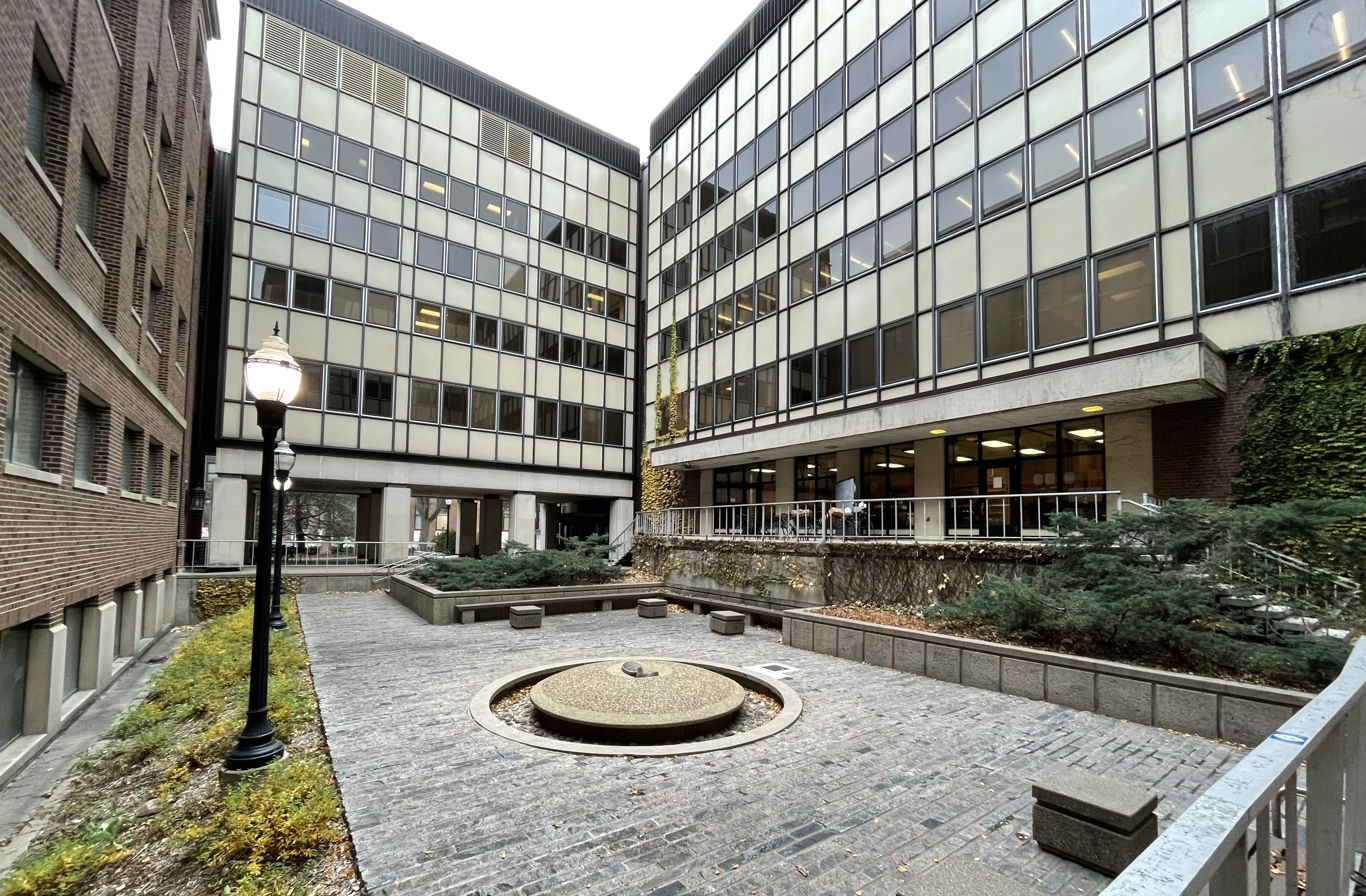
Vincent Murphy Courtyard in 2023

Architects: Roger Martin with Winston Close and Ralph Rapson

A critically acclaimed example of modern architecture, built as part of a renovation linking Vincent and Murphy Halls together, and located between the two buildings. The design, created by landscape architect Roger Martin with support from University Architect, Winston Close, and Head of the university's School of Architecture, Ralph Rapson, replaced an earlier concept by the architecture-engineering firm Toltz, King & Day, who were in charge of building the connections between the two buildings, that was considered to be less sophisticated. No evidence exists about the condition and usage of the space prior to its construction. The courtyard's furnishings, circulation, and recessed design is meant to invoke a sense of peacefulness, unique from the rest of the campus. A 15-foot diameter dome-shaped fountain made of concrete is set in the middle of the space with a jet of water flowing from the top and down the sides; the initial jet reaching a height of three feet and eight inches, and meant to be visible when entering.

== Kolthoff Hall, 1971 ==
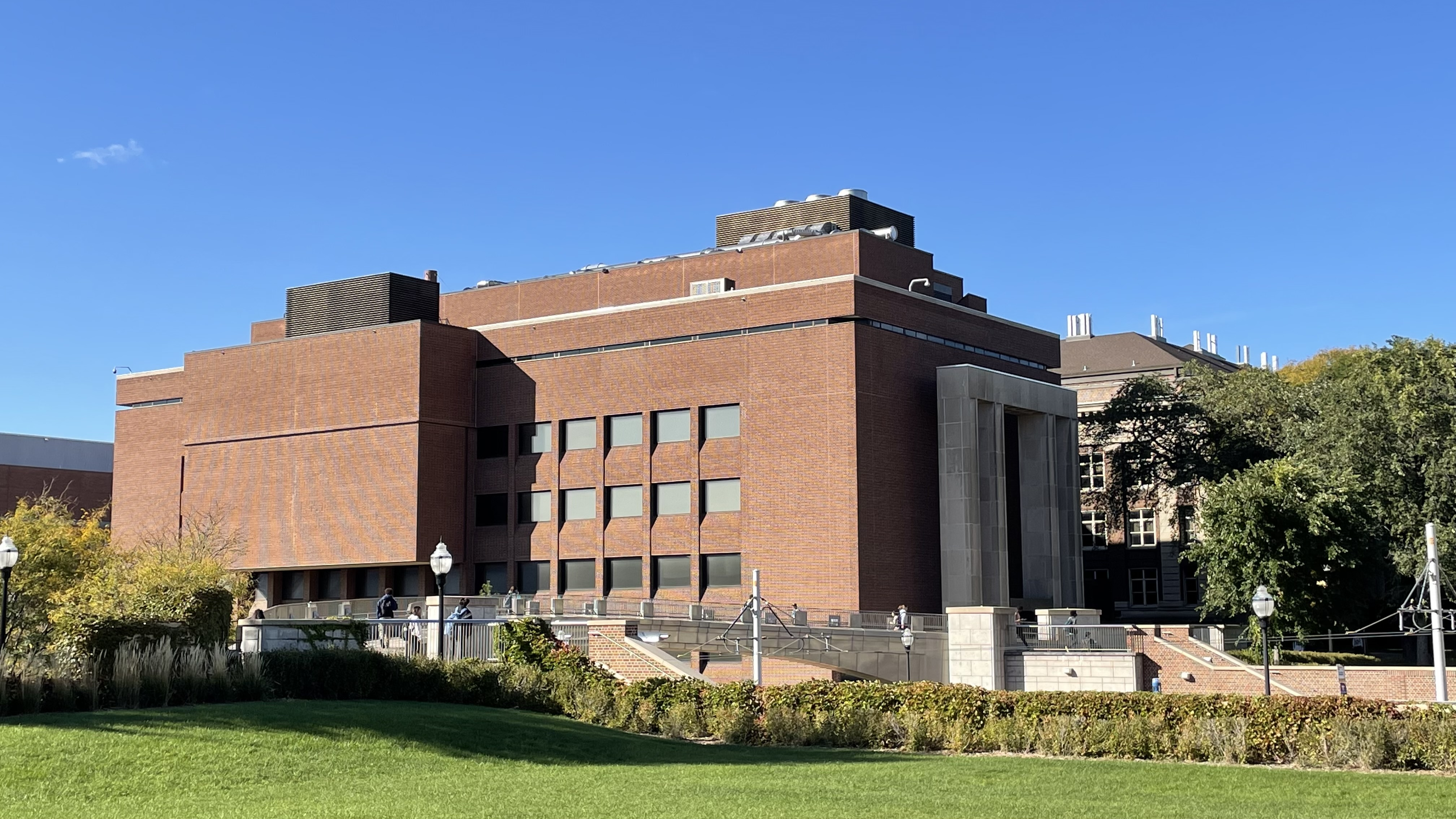
Kolthoff Hall in 2023

Built to accommodate the large number of students attending the School of Chemistry and named after Izaak “Piet” Maurits Kolthoff, a professor of analytical chemistry at the university from 1927 to 1962. In May 1972, during the student anti-Vietnam War rally at the nearby Coffman Memorial Union that former United States Senator Eugene McCarthy spoke at, an explosion occurred at Kolthoff Hall, injuring a graduate student. The building was renovated in 2006, in which laboratory space was expanded, equipment was upgraded, and the offices were separated from the lab areas. Within the mall-facing entryway of the building is a periodic table made up of the actual elements.

== Gallery ==
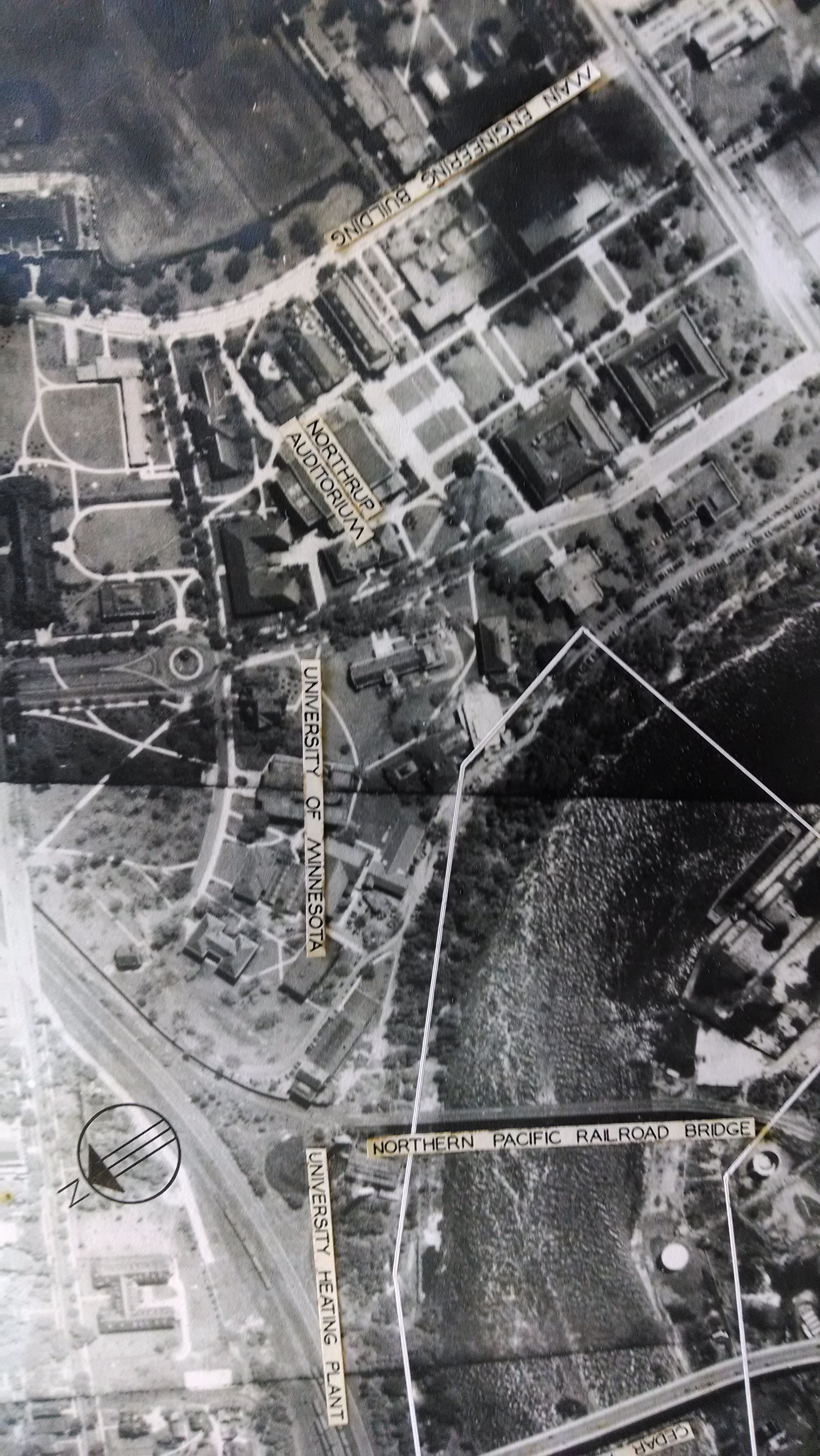
Aerial view of the now-Northrop Mall Historic District in April 1936

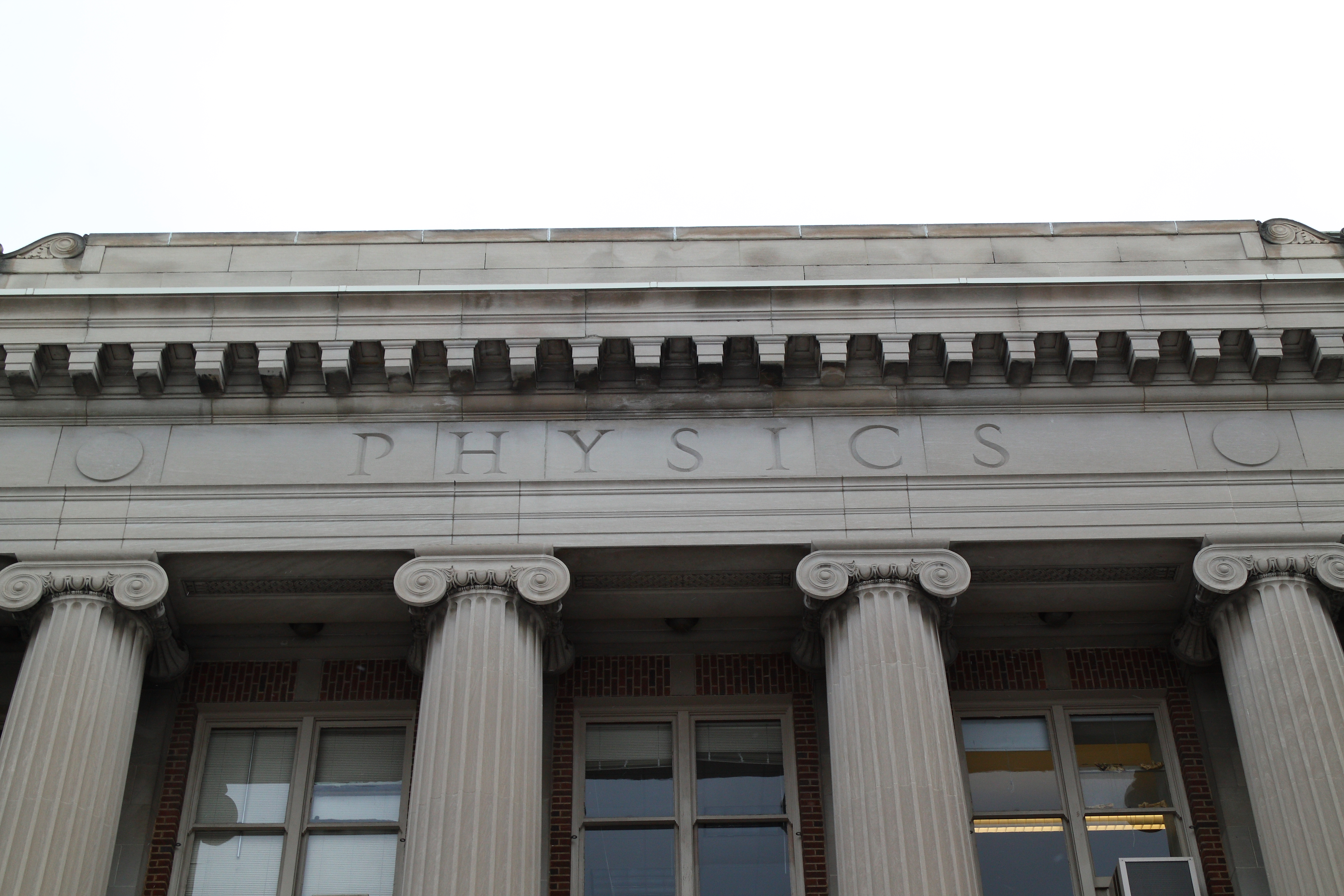
Closeup of "Physics" engraved on the front of Tate Hall

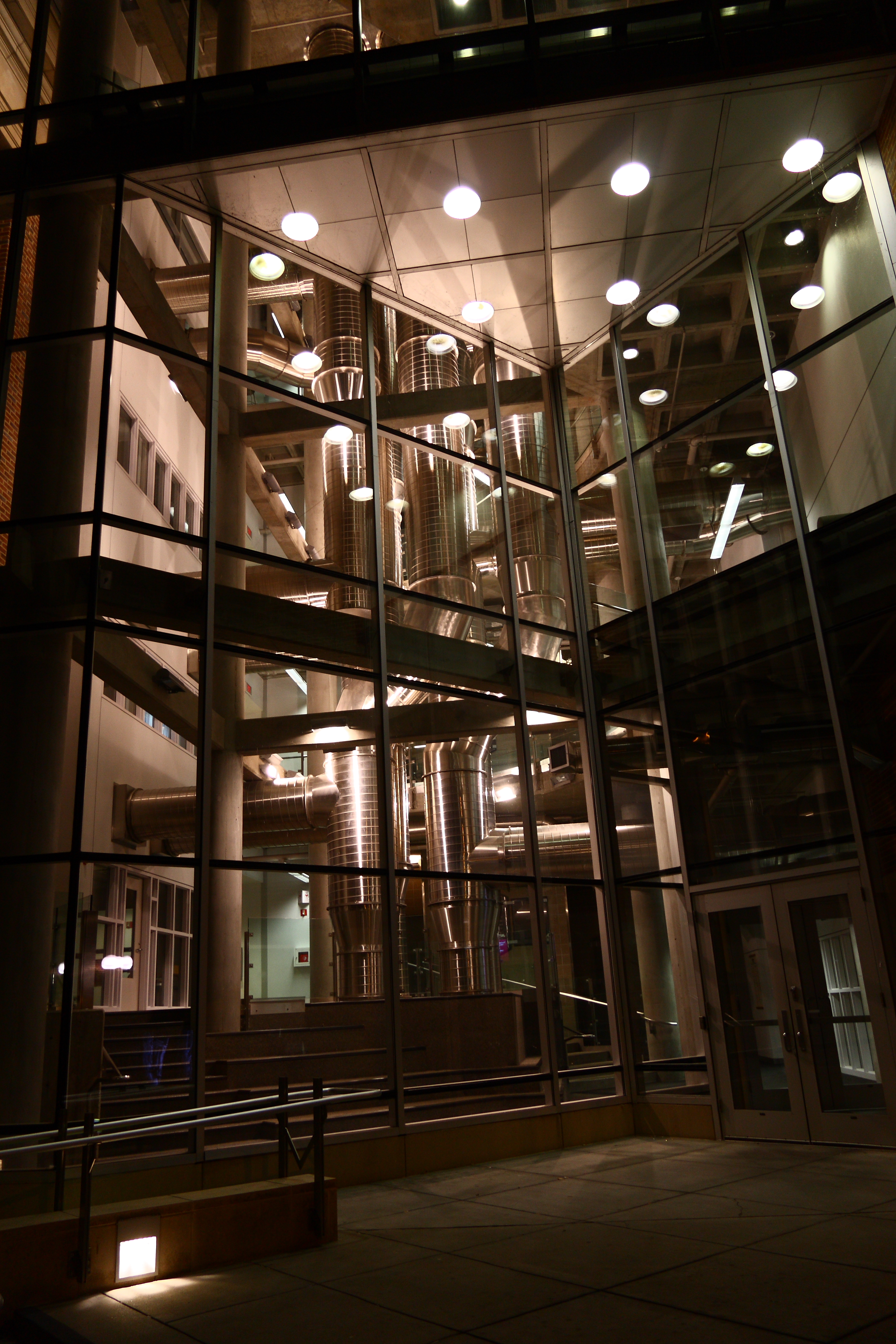
The south wing expansion of the Mechanical Engineering Building at night

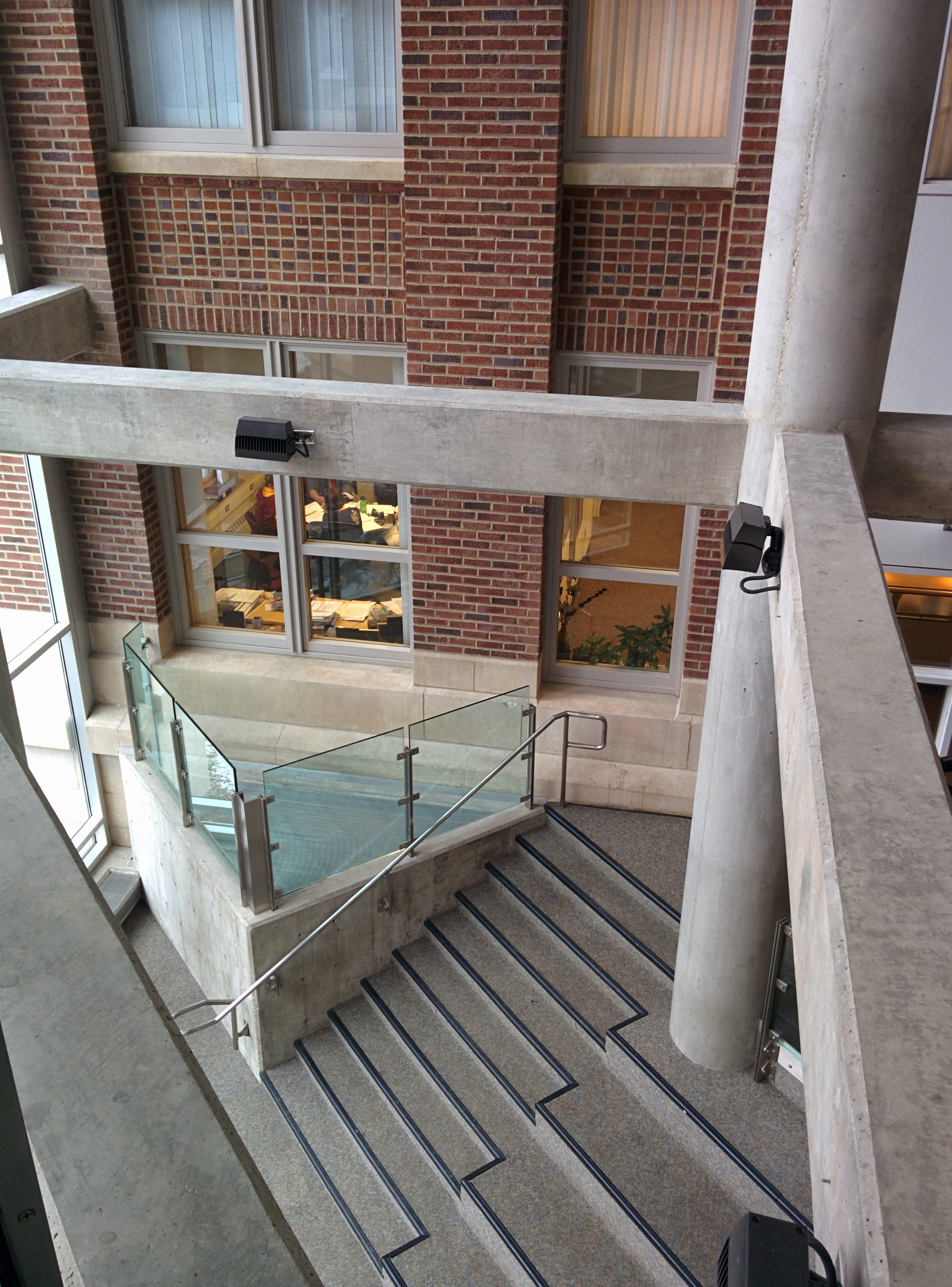
The Mechanical Engineering Building's south wing atrium

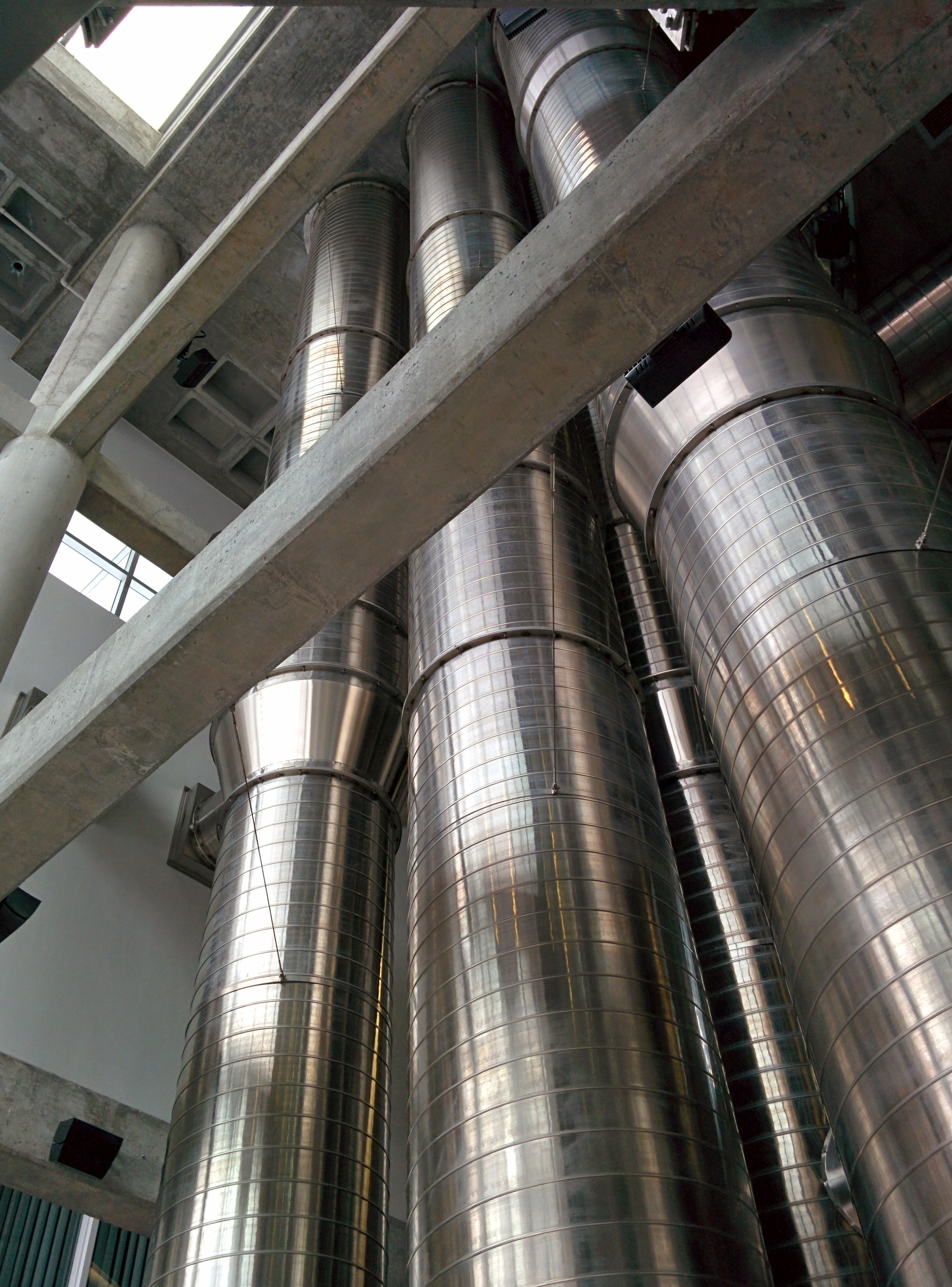
Air handling ducts inside the Mechanical Engineering Building's south wing expansion

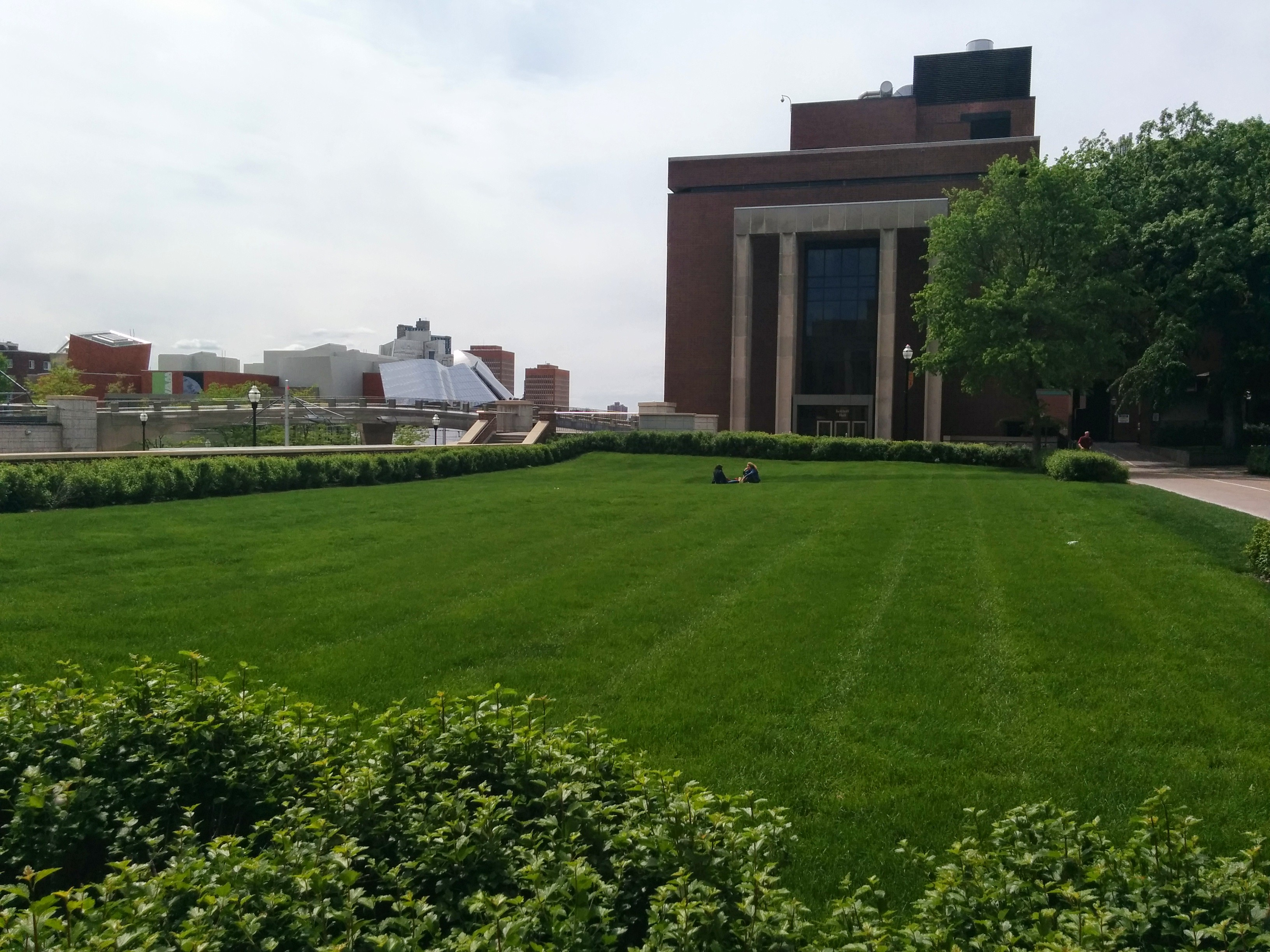
Kolthoff Hall as seen from directly across the mall

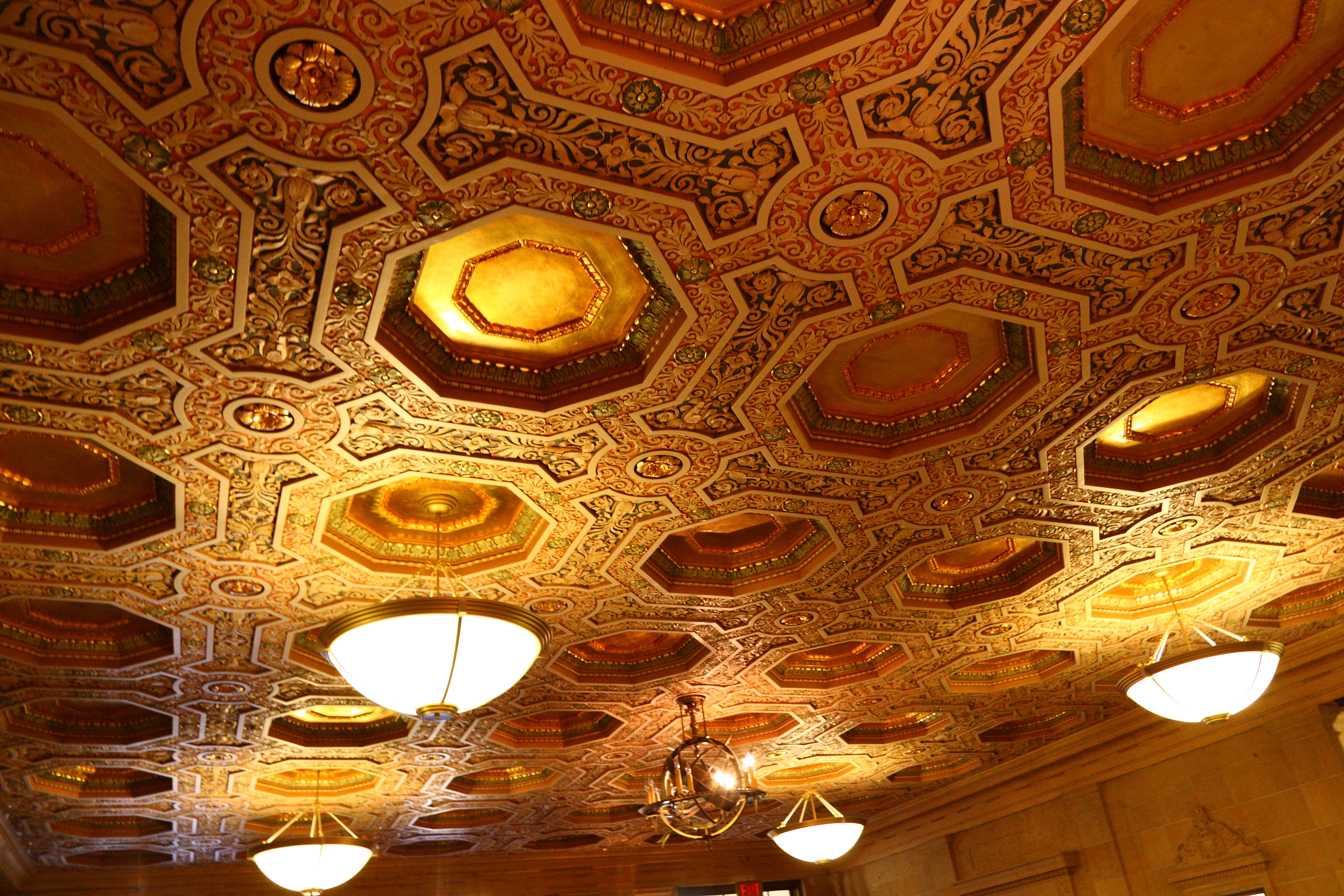
The ceiling of Walter Library's lobby

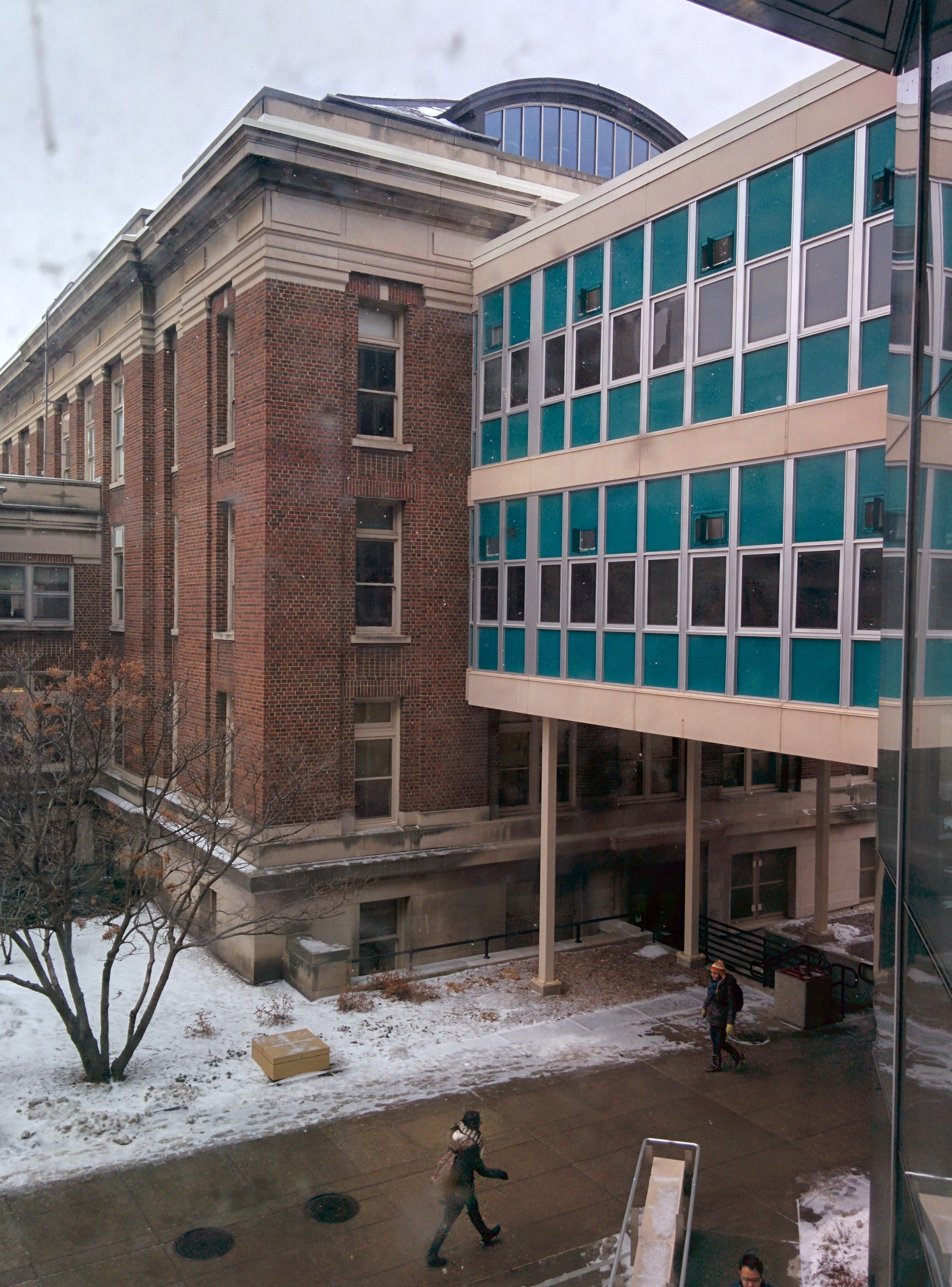
A skyway between Lind Hall and the Mechanical Engineering Building, as seen from inside the latter

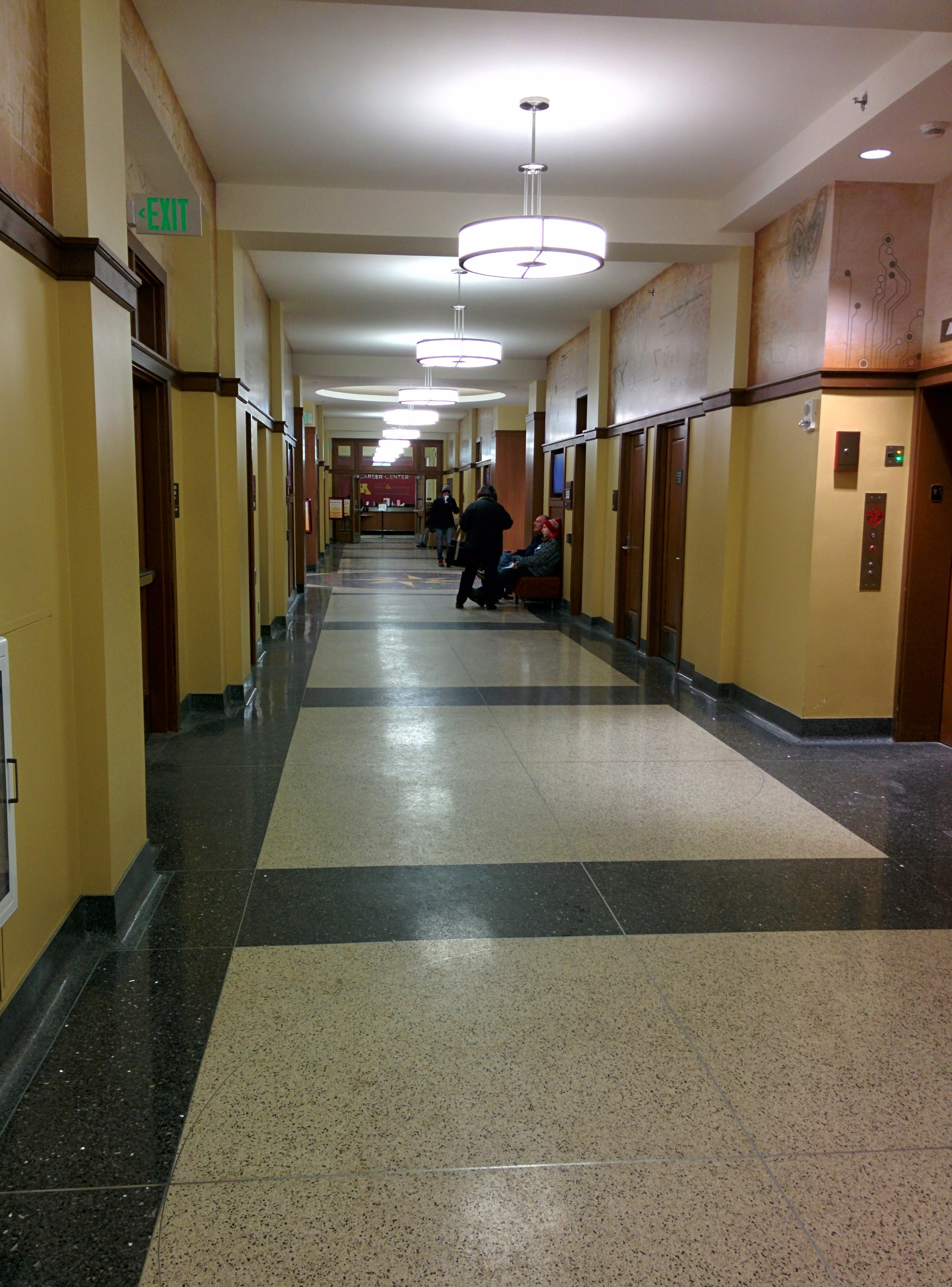
A hallway inside Lind Hall

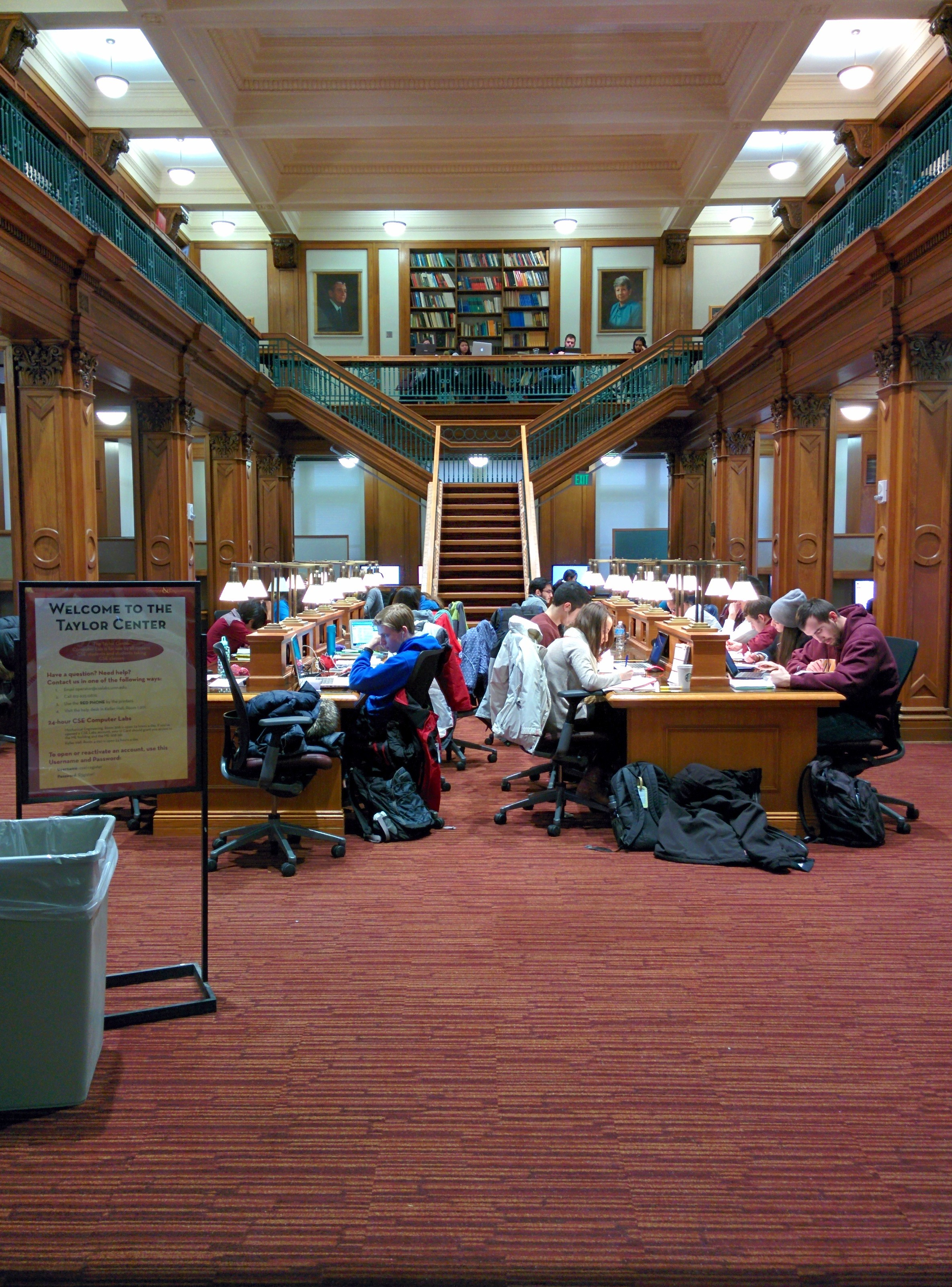
The Lind Hall Taylor Center

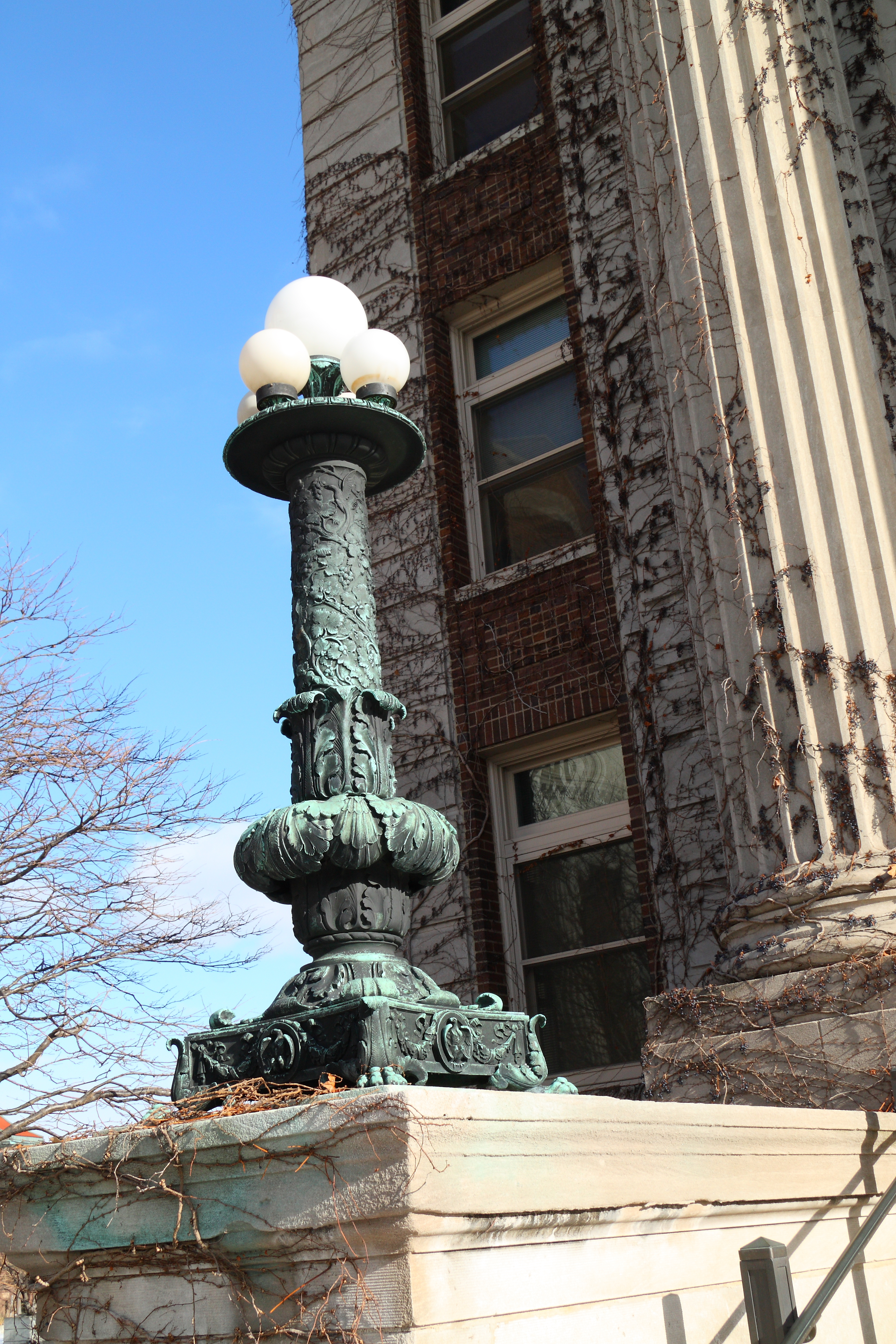
A lamp post on the steps to Morrill Hall

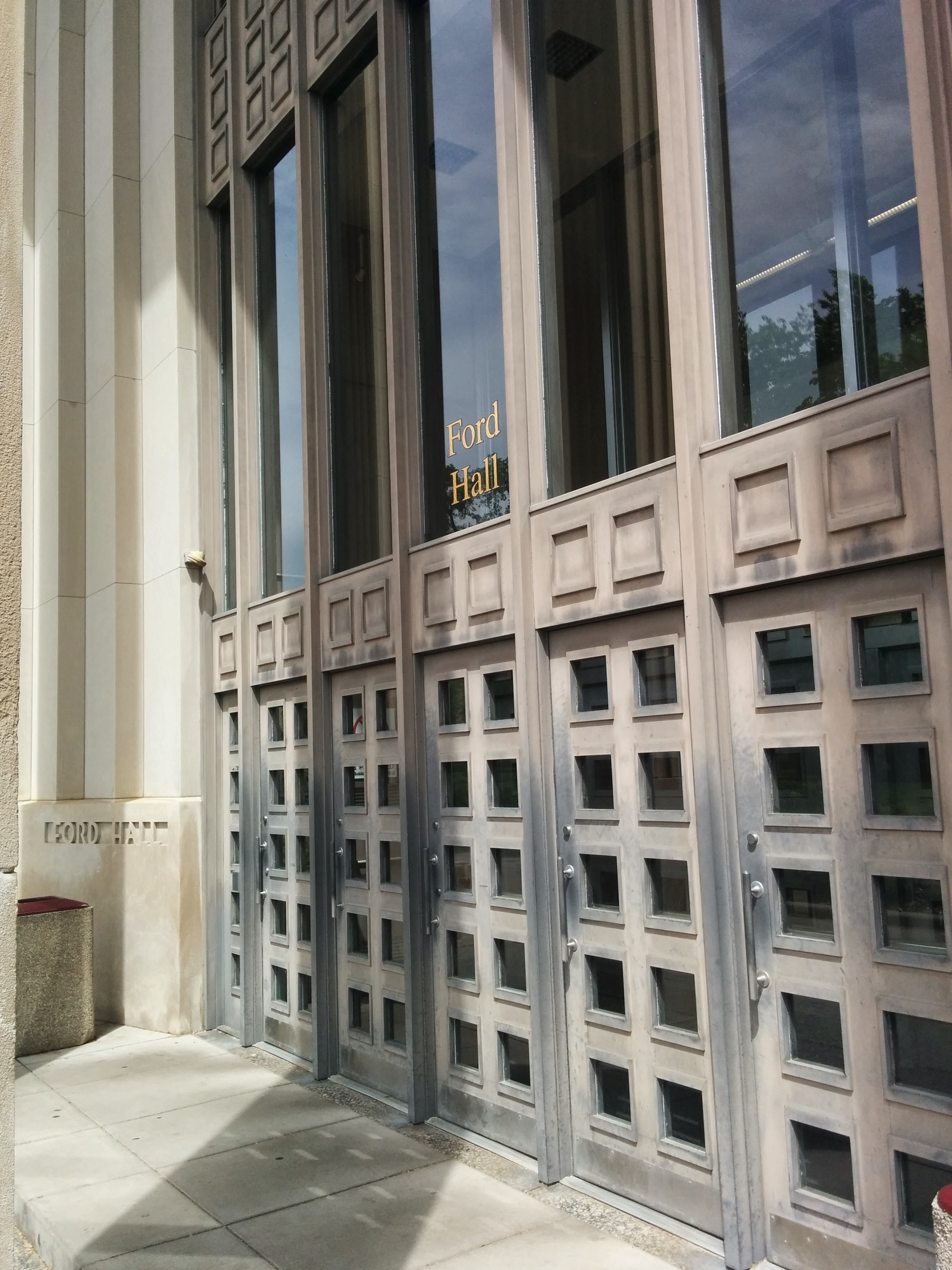
The mall-facing entrance to Ford Hall

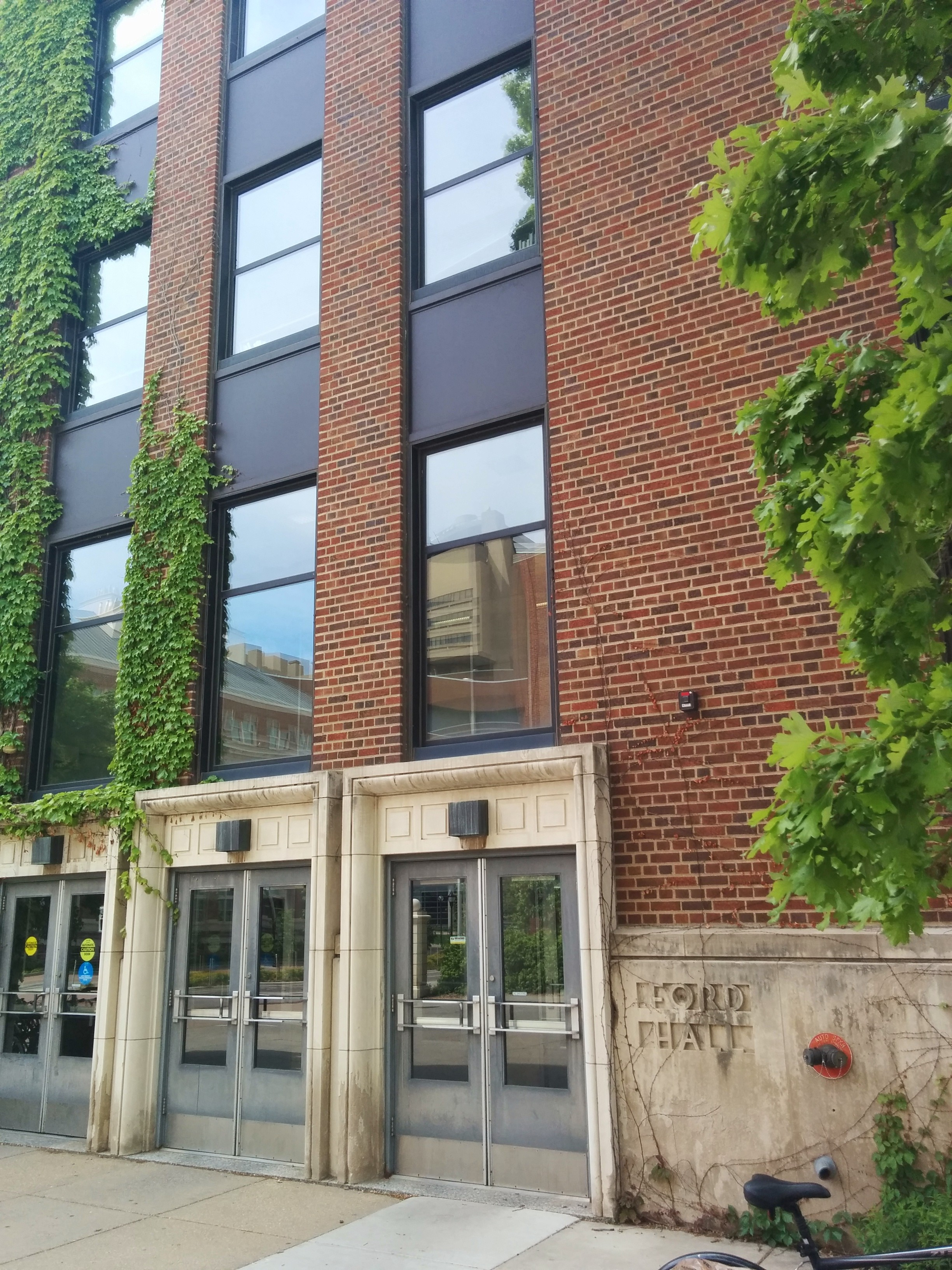
Ford Hall's rear entrance

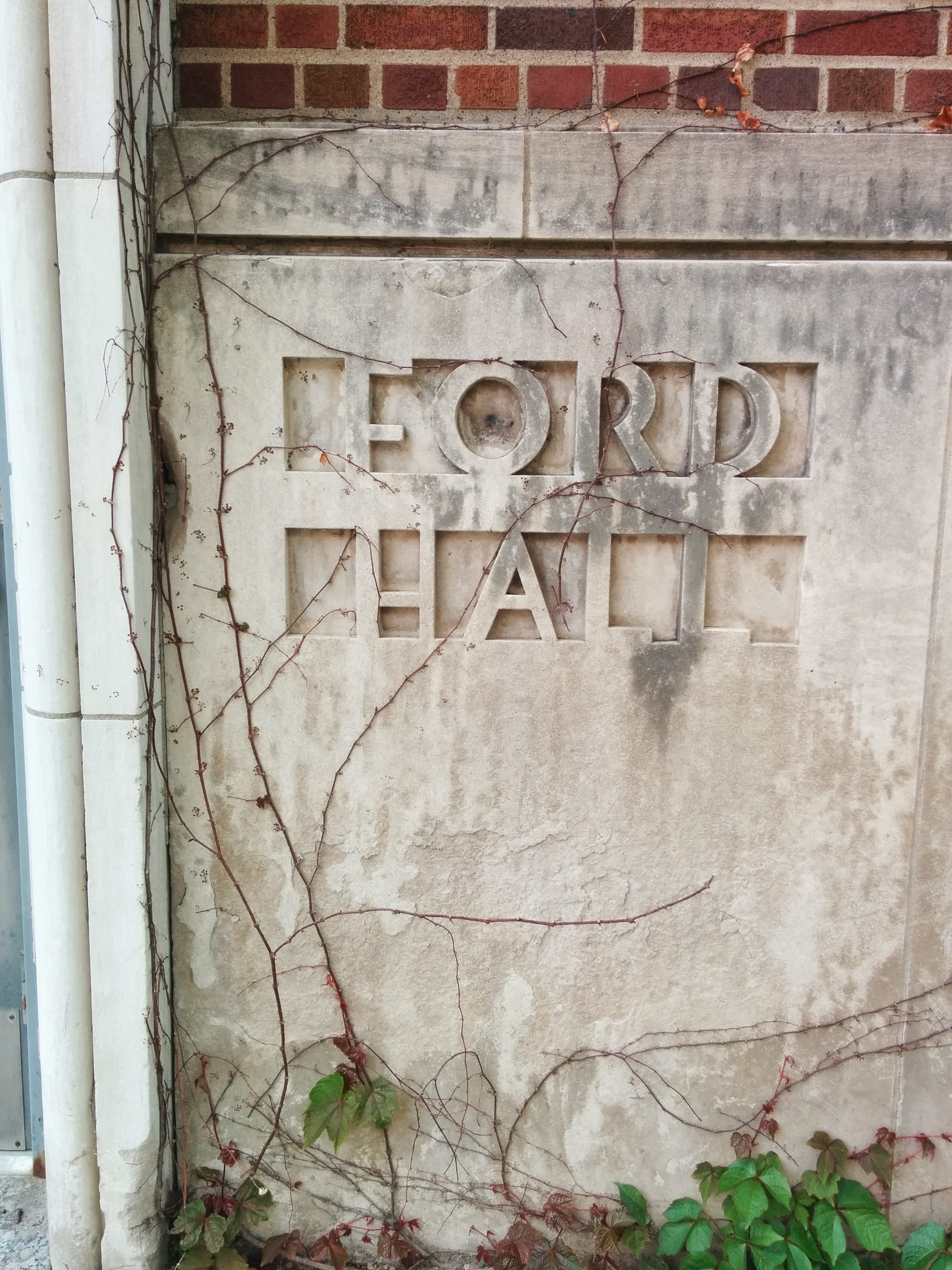
Closeup of "Ford Hall", engraved on the rear of the building

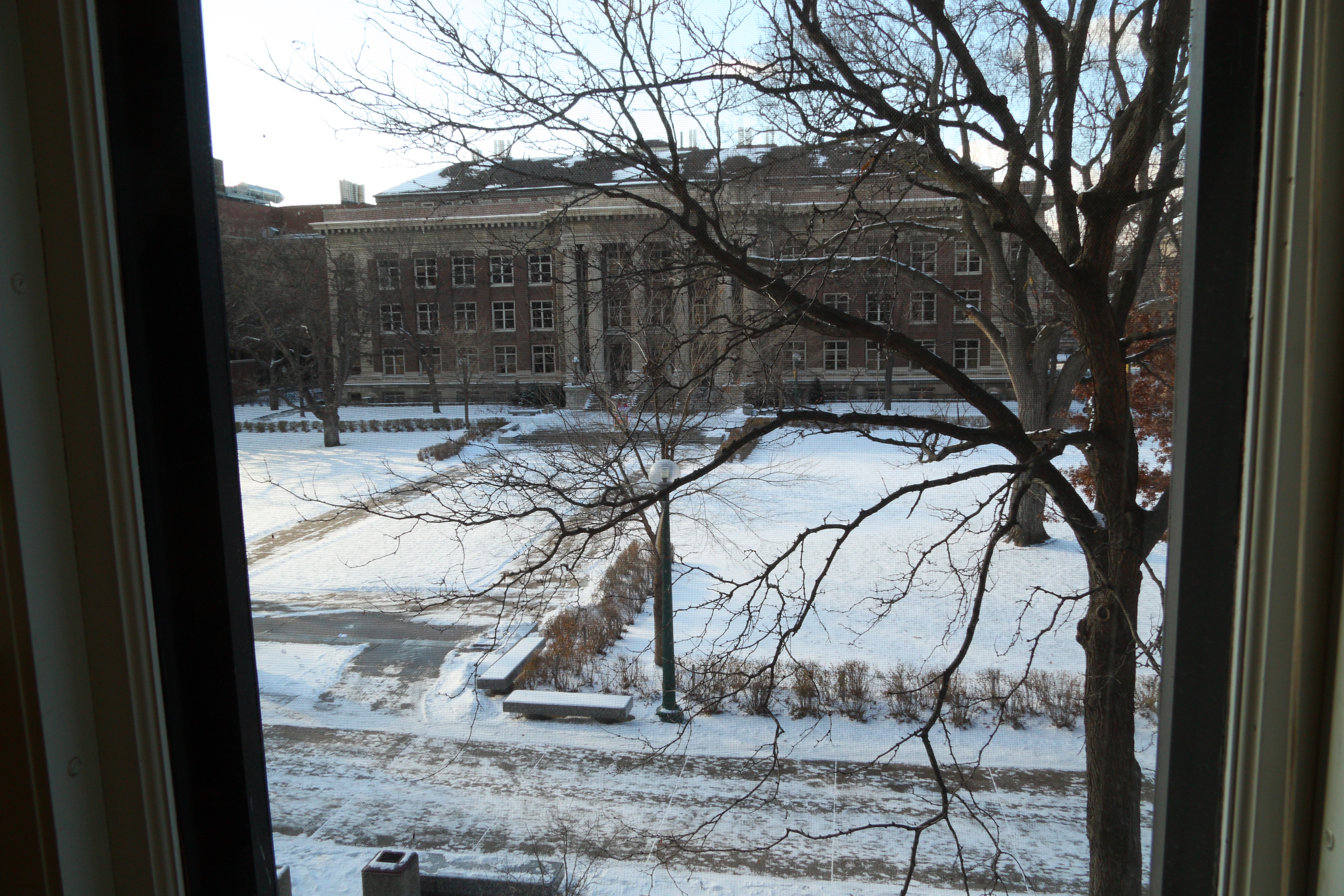
Smith Hall as seen from inside Vincent Hall

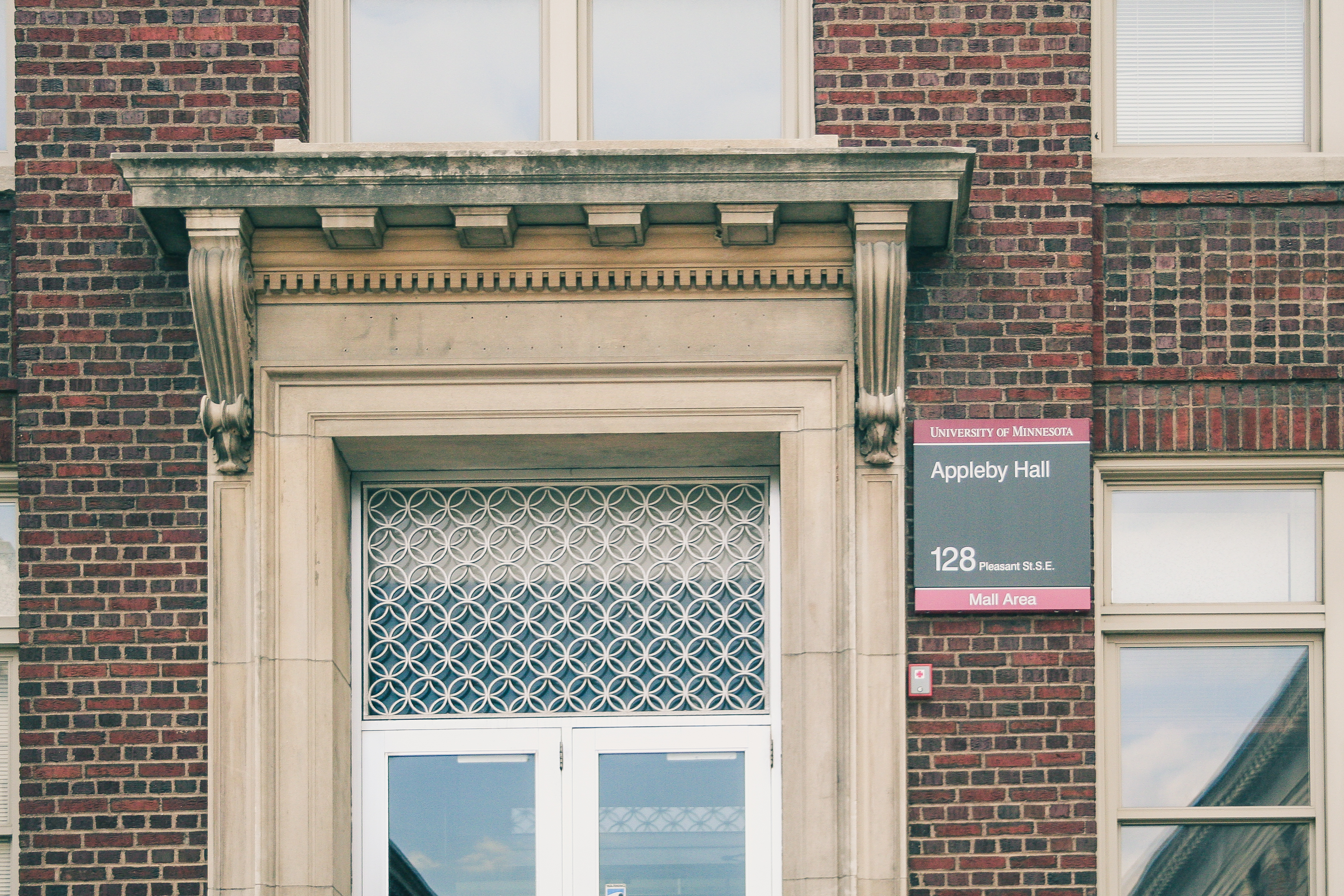
The entrance of Appleby Hall in 2007

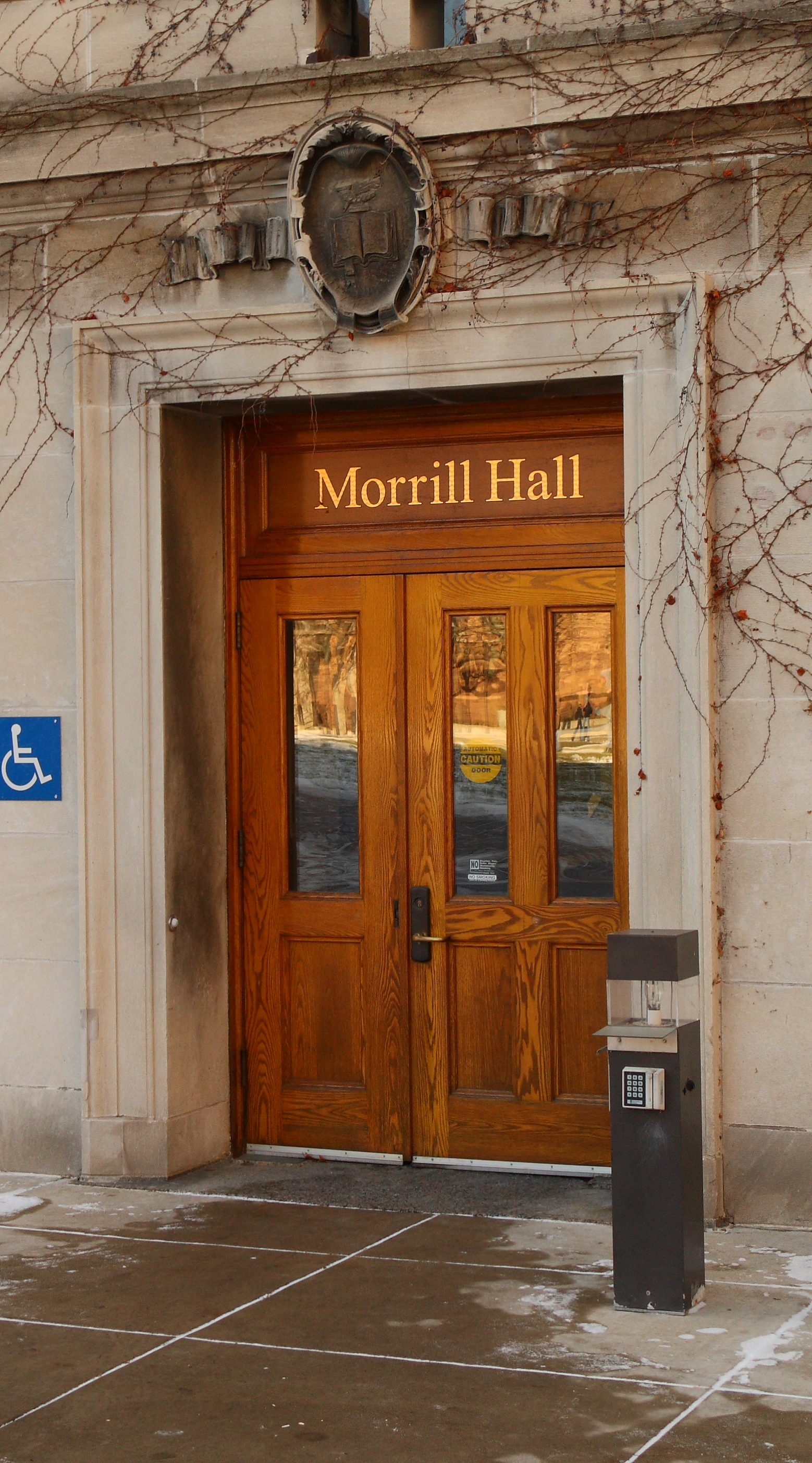
The north entrance to Morrill Hall in 2008

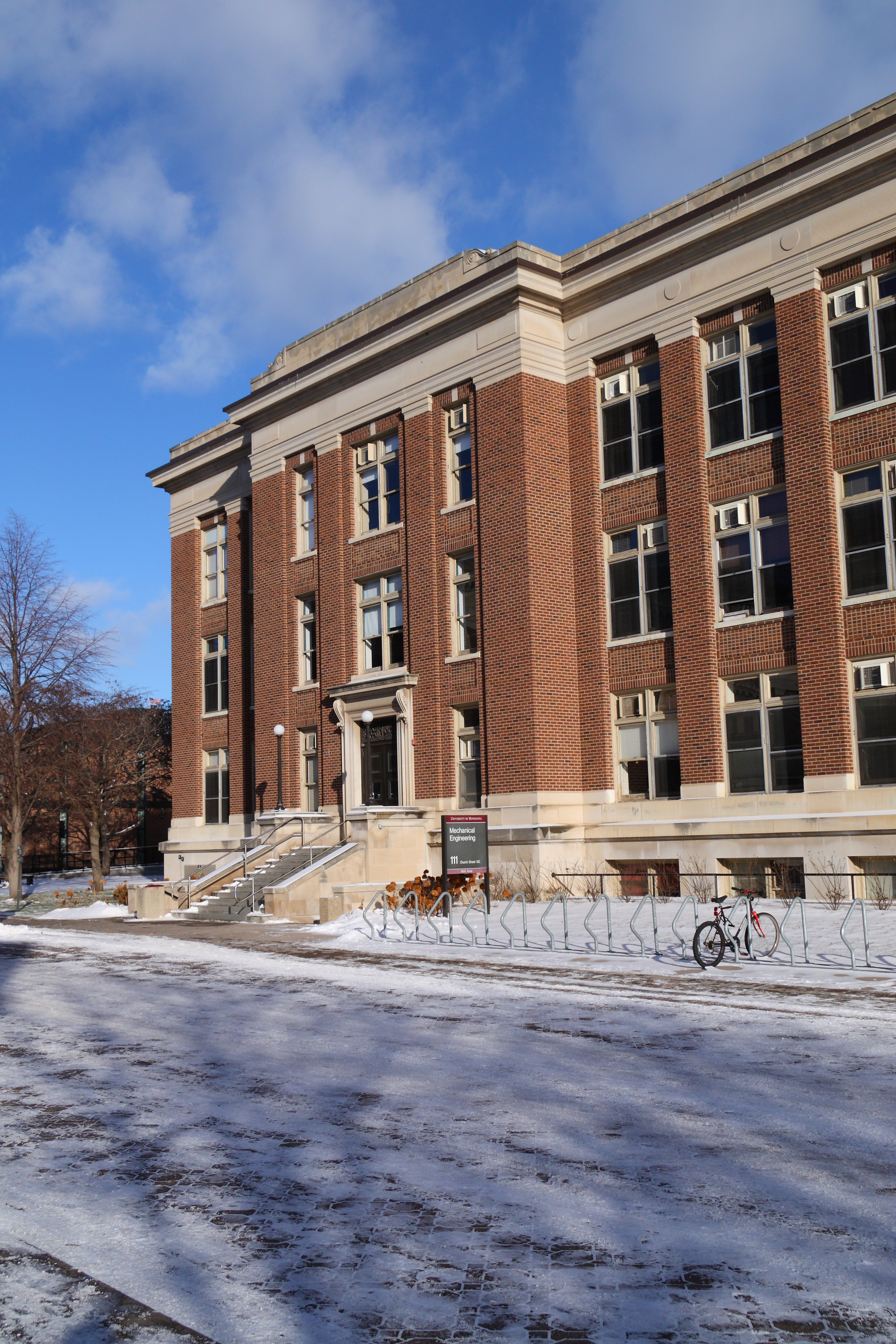
The Mechanical Engineering Building in 2008

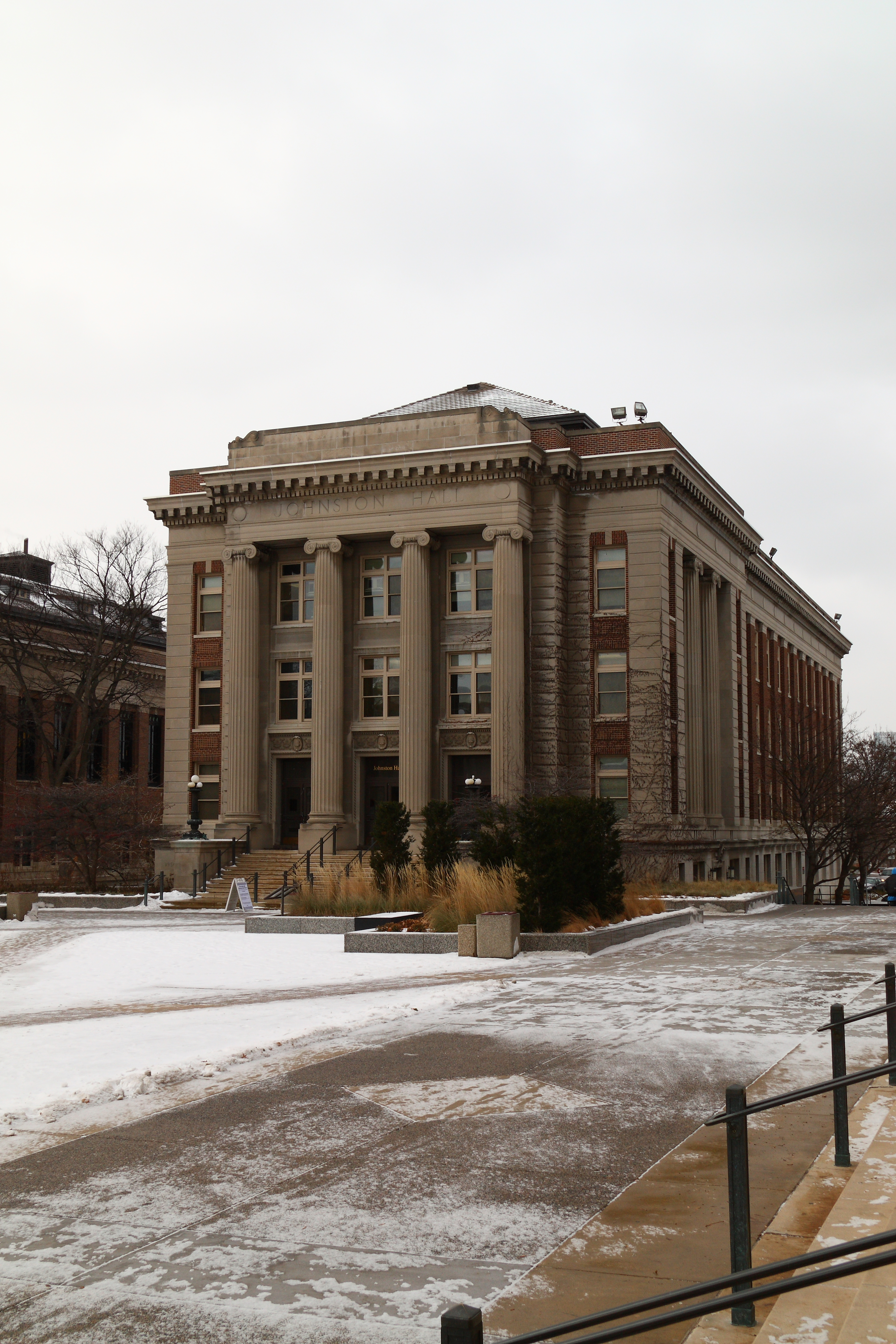
Johnston Hall in 2008

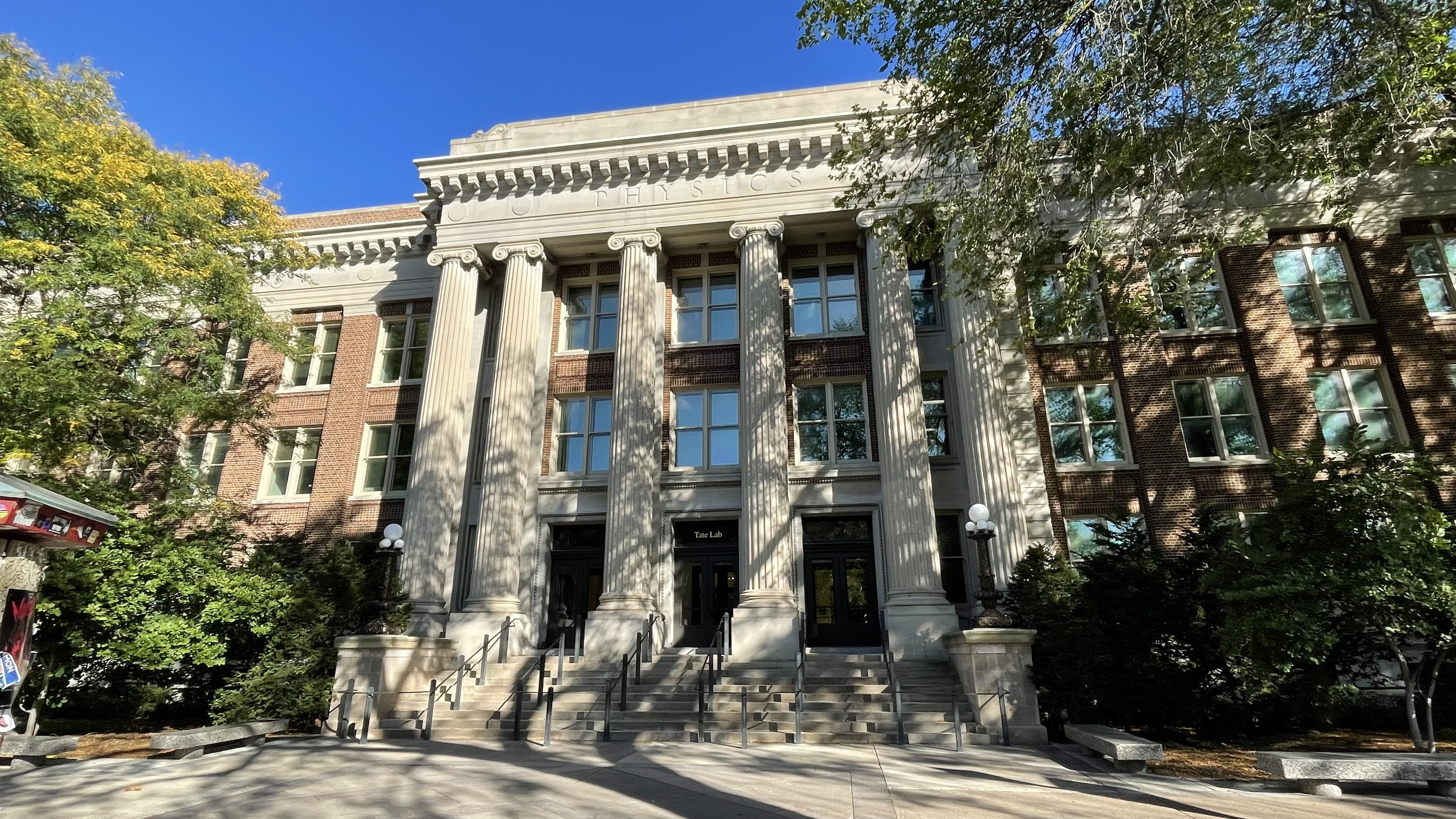
Tate Hall in October 2023

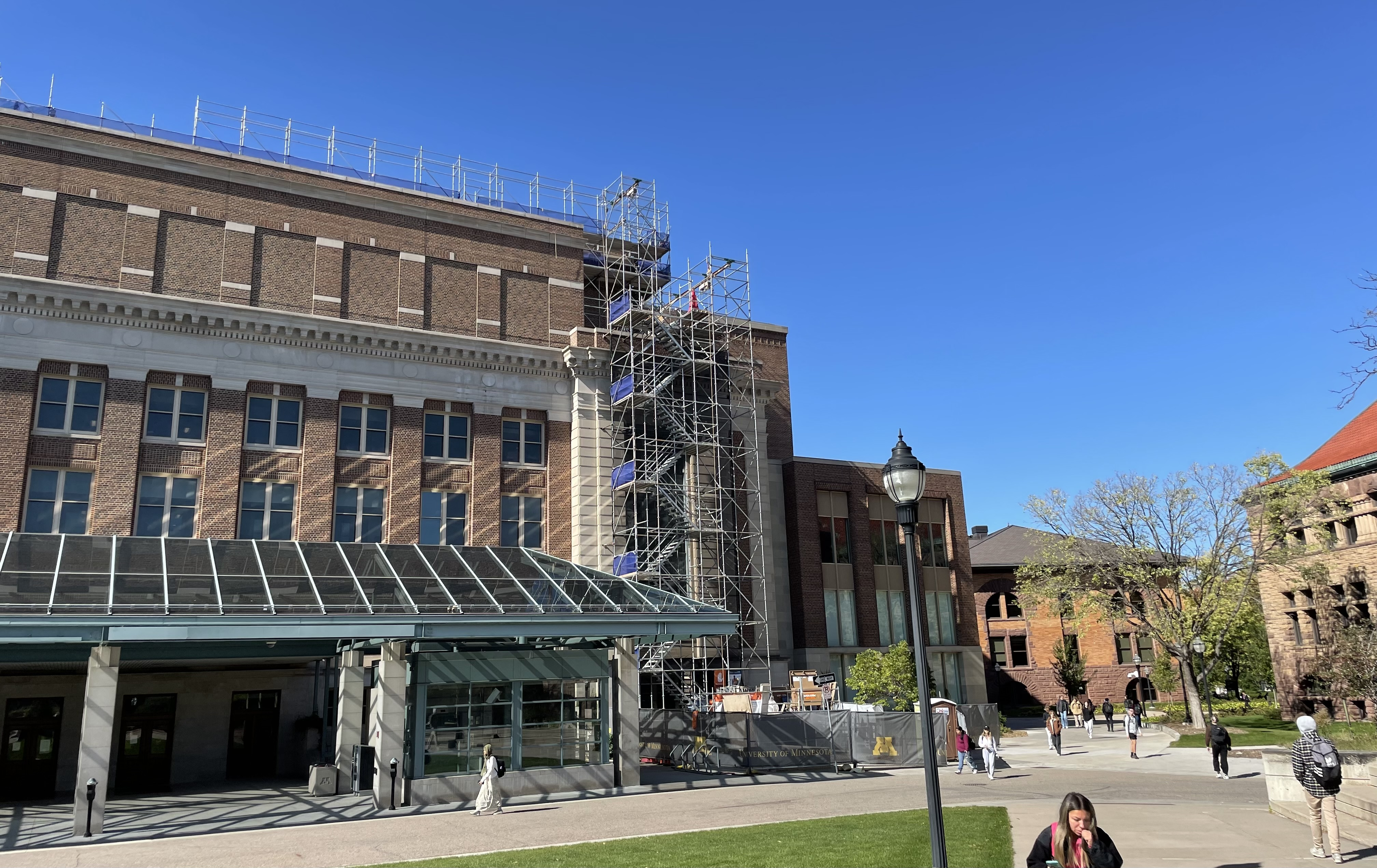
Northrop under repair in October 2023
