= Andreas G. Boudouvis =

Greek academic, former Rector

Andreas G. Boudouvis (born 1959) is a Greek chemical engineer and academic. He is a professor in the School of Chemical Engineering at the National Technical University of Athens (NTUA), where he served as Rector from 2019 to 2023 and as Dean of the School of Chemical Engineering from 2013 to 2016.

== Education and Academic Career ==
Boudouvis was born in Pyrgos, Elias. He earned his diploma in chemical engineering from NTUA in 1982, followed by a PhD from the University of Minnesota in 1987. His early research was supported by fellowships at the Minnesota Supercomputing Institute and the Army High Performance Computing Research Center.

Boudouvis has held several international visiting appointments, including positions at the Université de Lorraine, the Fondation de Coopération Scientifique in Toulouse, and Johns Hopkins University.

During his rectorship Boudouvis promoted the internationalization of NTUA. He was a founding member of the European Universities Linking Society and Technology alliance, an initiative established in 2023 to foster cooperation between European technical universities. He served as the alliance's Co-Chair from 2021 to 2023. As rector he took action against violence and lawlessness on campus. The campaign to restore legality moved forward and achieved positive results, despite the reactions of illegal groups.

== Research and Teaching ==
Boudouvis's work focuses on transport phenomena and computational methods in engineering. His research interests include interfacial phenomena, nonlinear dynamics, and large-scale scientific computing. Over his tenure, he has supervised more than 20 doctoral dissertations and over 100 diploma theses.

In 2024, he was honored with the Award for Excellence in Academic Teaching by the Foundation for Research and Technology – Hellas (FORTH). The award, given in memory of V. Xanthopoulos and S. Pnevmatikos, was presented by the President of Greece, Katerina Sakellaropoulou.

He is also a member of the Board of the Hellenic Institute of Advanced Studies (HIAS) and holds an honorary professorship from the University of West Attica.
