= Northrop Auditorium =

Performing arts venue at the University of Minnesota in Minneapolis

- Grande Dame of the Twin Cities; Heart of the University of Minnesota
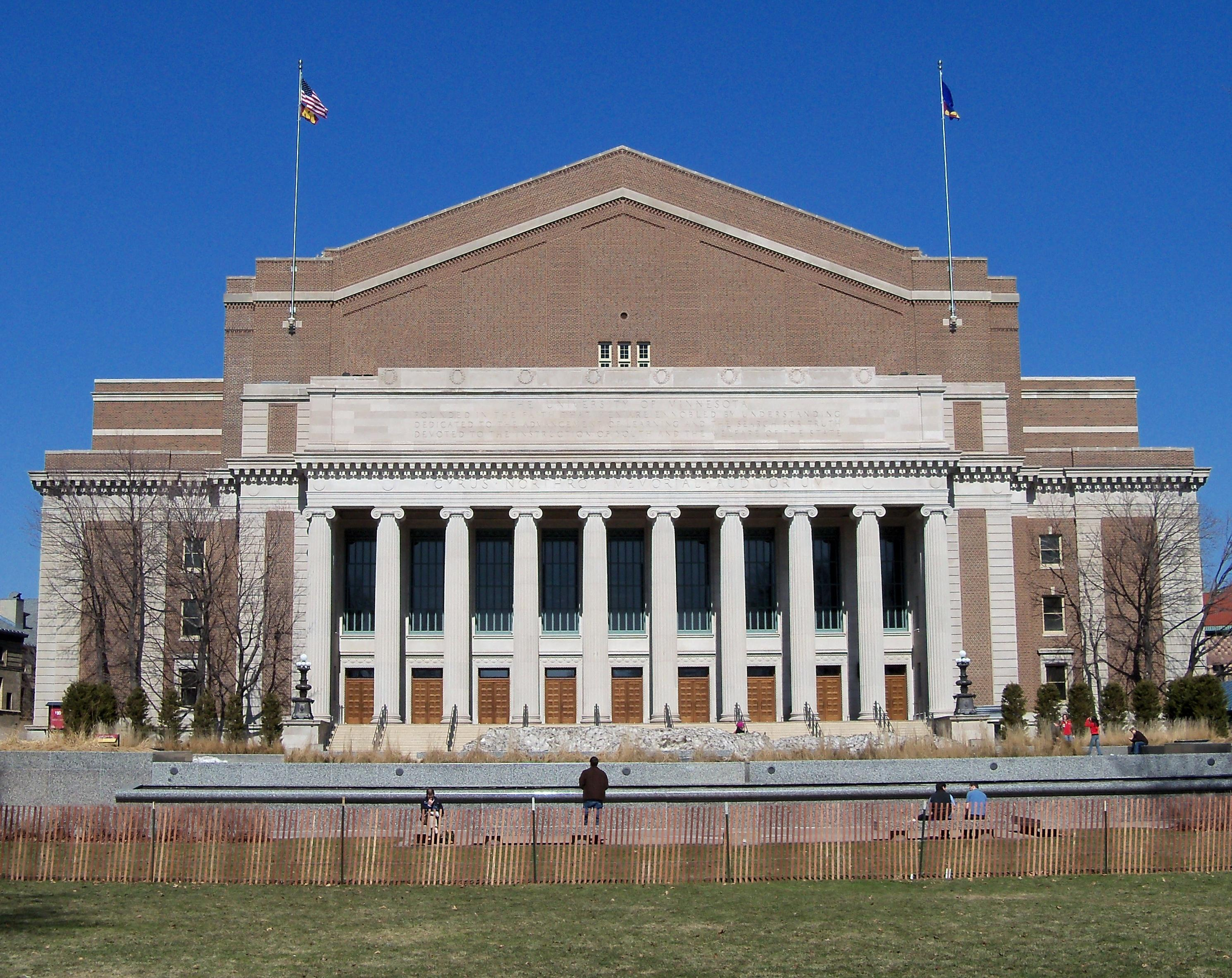
- Northrop as seen from Northrop Mall
- Interactive map of Northrop Auditorium
- Full name: Cyrus Northrop Memorial Auditorium
- Address: 84 Church Street SE; Minneapolis, MN 55455-0281
- Location: Northrop Mall, University of Minnesota
- Owner: Board of Regents of the University of Minnesota
- Operator: University of Minnesota Tickets and Events
- Capacity: 2,692 (2014–present); 4,847 (1929–2011); 168 (Best Buy Theater)

Construction
- Groundbreaking: April 30, 1928
- Opened: October 22, 1929; April 4, 2014 (grand reopening)
- Renovated: 2006 (exterior); 2011–2014 (interior)
- Closed: 2011–2014
- Cost: $1.2 million (1929) $21 million (2006 exterior restoration) $88.2 million (2011–2014 interior renovation)
- Architects: Clarence H. Johnston Sr. (1929); HGA (2014)

Tenants
- Minneapolis Symphony Orchestra (1929–1974); Weisman Art Museum (1934–1993); University of Minnesota Marching Band (1929–2009)

Website
- www.northrop.umn.edu

Cyrus Northrop Memorial Auditorium (commonly known as Northrop Auditorium or simply Northrop) is a performing arts venue located on the East Bank campus of the University of Minnesota in Minneapolis, Minnesota. It is named in honor of Cyrus Northrop, the university's second president. The auditorium hosts a variety of events, including concerts, ballet performances, lectures, and graduation ceremonies.

Northrop Auditorium is located at the north end of Northrop Mall, a grassy area in the center of the campus. The mall is surrounded by several buildings, including those for physics, mathematics, chemistry, and administration, as well as Walter Library. Coffman Memorial Union is located at the south end of the mall, directly across Washington Avenue from Northrop Auditorium.

== History ==
=== Construction ===
Northrop Auditorium was built between 1928 and 1929 as part of a major university expansion project. An auditorium had been part of Cass Gilbert's plan for Northrop Mall dating back to 1908, but it wasn't until 1922, when Cyrus Northrop died, that the university took serious interest in the project. Northrop Auditorium was dedicated both as a memorial to Cyrus Northrop and to the veterans of World War I. University officials raised $665,000 in student pledges, at an average of $80 per student, in a six-month period. It took three more years of fundraising and debate over the size and form of the auditorium before the project came to full fruition. The Greater University Corporation finally submitted a request to have the plans drawn up in the fall of 1926, with a cost not to exceed $1 million.

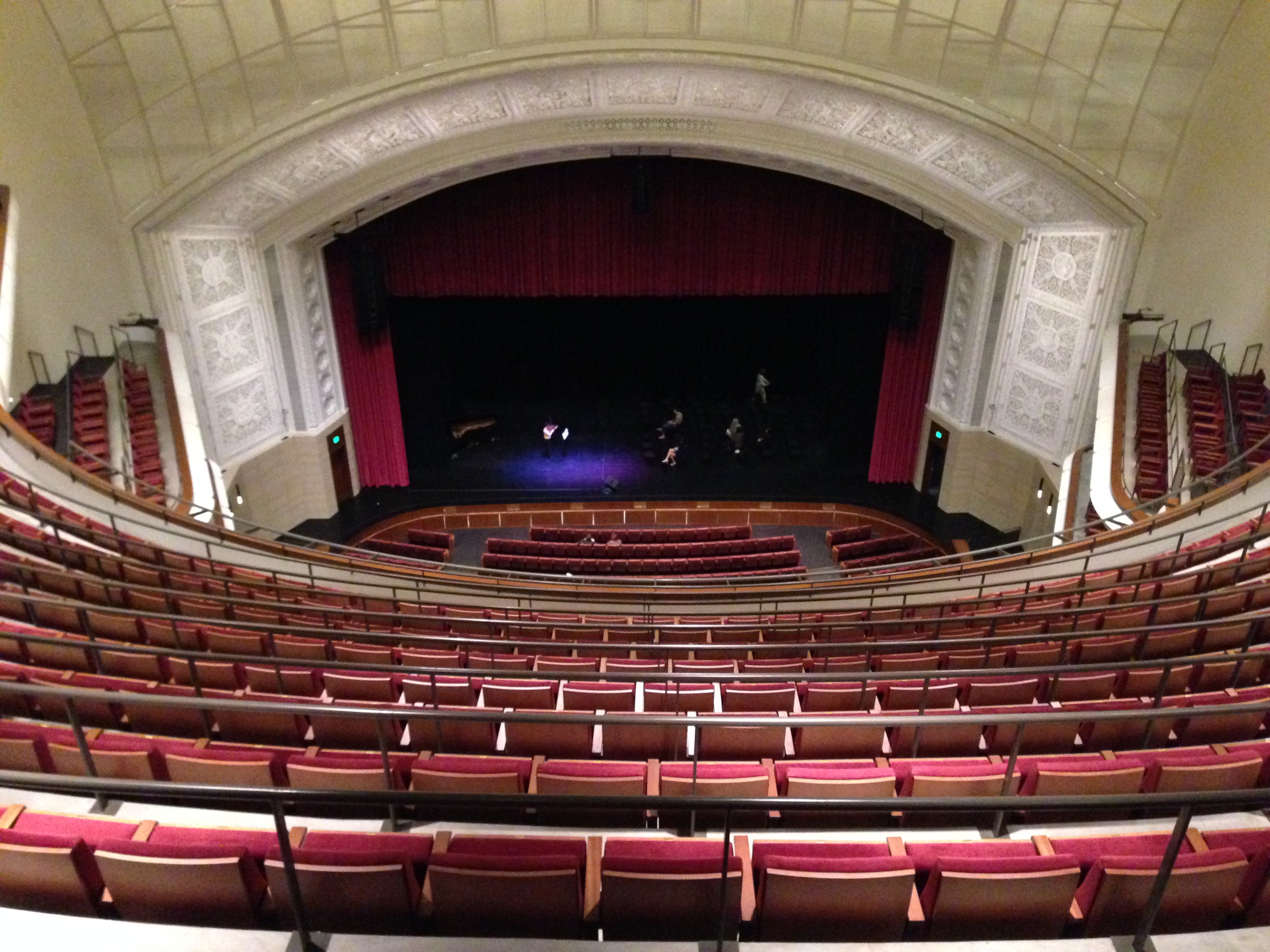
Carlson Family Stage

Frederick Mann, chair of the university's School of Architecture, submitted a building concept that featured a classical portico with pediment. However, the amount of ornamentation and sculptural carving required for the design would have exceeded cost limits and appeared incongruous with the more understated buildings on the sides of the mall. Project architect Clarence H. Johnston Sr. thus toned down Mann's design by making the pediment flat and by turning the roof behind it into a gable. Johnston borrowed some design elements from the portico of the Low Memorial Library at Columbia University for the revised design. The proportions of the frieze and attic, the Ionic order, and the count of ten columns matched those from the Low Library, but the monumental gable parapet had no resemblance to the library's dome. Plans were completed in February 1928, after much debate. The inscription on the attic was not decided upon until after the building was ready for occupancy, even though Johnston had requested the inscription be included in the building contract. The inscription reads:

The University of Minnesota
Founded in the Faith that Men are Ennobled by Understanding
Dedicated to the Advancement of Learning and the Search for Truth
Devoted to the Instruction of Youth and the Welfare of the State

Northrop's grand opening occurred on October 22, 1929 with a performance by the Minneapolis Symphony Orchestra. The celebration continued with a performance by the Boston Symphony on October 30 and the "Alumni and State Program" on November 15.

== Renovation ==
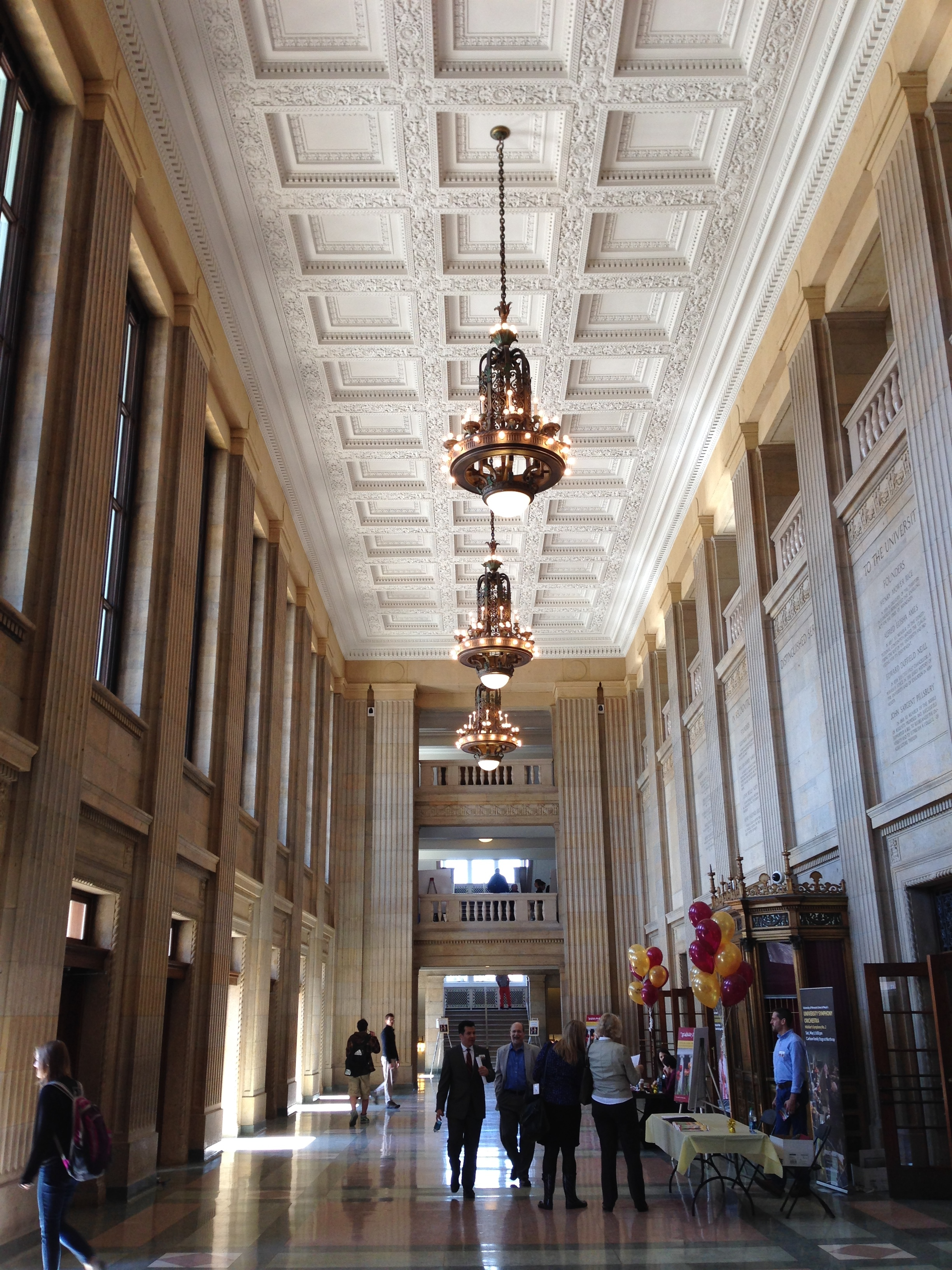
Memorial Hall

After eighty years of continuous use and timely decay, Northrop was in dire need of rehabilitation by the 2010s. An extensive interior renovation finally began in February 2011. With a design team led by architects Tim Carl and Jim Moore of HGA, the renovation project aimed to retain the building's historic character while making it a state-of-the-art performance space. The renovation reduced seating in the main theater from 4,847 to 2,692 and greatly improved sight lines and acoustics. The new design allowed for a second theater space with seating for 168 to be added on the fourth floor. Offices for the University Honors Program and Institute for Advanced Study, a backstage rehearsal studio, and a main floor cafe were also included in the new design. Important design features such as the proscenium arch and interior columns were preserved as part of the project. Memorial Hall, the building's historic lobby, received a full restoration.

Northrop reopened to the public on April 4, 2014. During the grand reopening celebration, university provost Karen Hanson delivered a speech addressing the history of Northrop and her vision for the future. Conversation with members of the audience produced a number of stories, including one about the ghost of a former stage manager. The American Ballet Theatre subsequently rechristened the stage with a performance of Giselle. Since then, Northrop has continued to serve as a center for art, entertainment, and various university functions. Dance performances and university graduations are held in the building regularly. Lectures and concerts are also common. It further serves as a popular study space for students during the day.

Northrop was formally listed in the National Register of Historic Places as a contributing property to the Northrop Mall Historic District in January 2018.

== Roof collapse ==
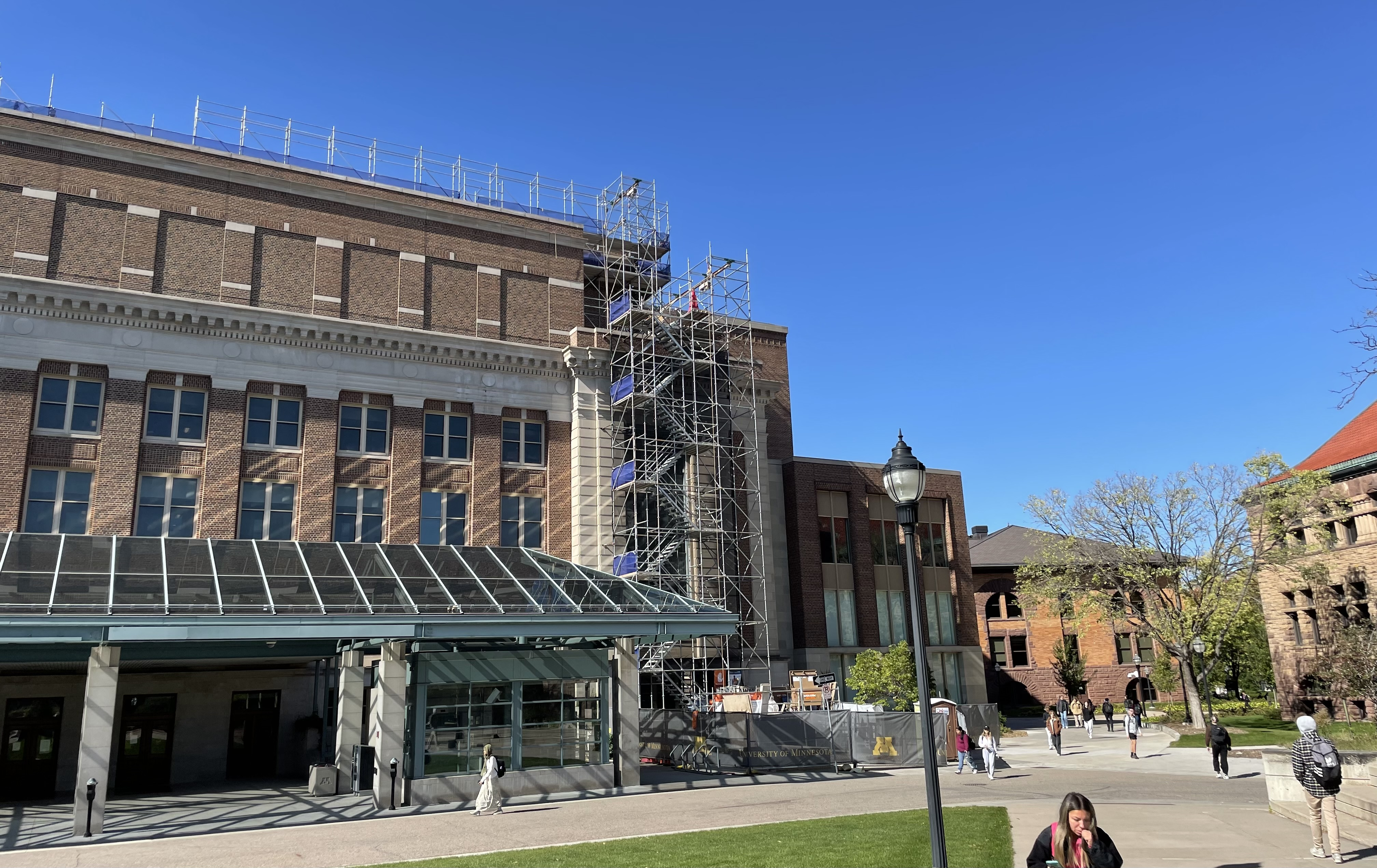
Northrop under repair in October 2023

Around 7:30 PM on January 11, 2023, police and firefighters responded to reports of a loud noise heard at the building and found that the east side of the roof had partially collapsed. No injuries were sustained, though an adjacent underground parking garage was temporarily closed while the building was examined. The theater did not receive any damage and the building reopened on January 30. According to Northrop's blog, the cause of the collapse was a parapet wall failure. Repairs were completed by January of the following year.

== Programming ==
Since its construction, Northrop has been frequently used for a variety of university functions. The auditorium was purportedly designed in 1929 to seat the entire student population in the event of mass assembly. It became the primary venue for university graduations when it hosted its first graduating class in 1930. Free, public lectures were held at Northrop on a weekly basis until 1969 and less frequently through the 1970s. The auditorium was also used as a meeting place for large classes from 1959 until the 1990s.

Dance has been a part of Northrop's programming since Mary Wigman first performed on its stage in 1932. However, it was not until the 1970s that it became Northrop's signature marketing niche. The Northrop Dance Season debuted in 1970–1971 and continues to the present day. The size of Northrop's stage makes it one of the only facilities in the region capable of accommodating major dance productions.

Pop and rock concerts seldom occurred at Northrop during the first 45 years of its history. However, they became more frequent when the university's Board of Regents reversed a decades-old booking policy in 1974. A now-infamous 1990 performance by the B-52's is remembered for causing part of the auditorium's plaster ceiling to collapse.

Several organizations have been based at Northrop over the course of its history. The building housed the Minneapolis Symphony Orchestra from the time of construction until 1973. The Weisman Art Museum was located within Northrop until a separate building was built in 1993. The University of Minnesota Marching Band regularly used the building for practice until 2009.

A sizable pipe organ was installed in the building between 1932 and 1936. With 6,982 pipes comprising 108 ranks and 81 speaking stops, it is the largest pipe organ in the Upper Midwest and the third largest Aeolian-Skinner pipe organ extant in the United States. The organ was removed from the building in 2011, but was restored and reinstalled between 2016 and 2017. The organ's return was celebrated with a pair of inaugural concerts on October 12 and 13, 2018.

== In popular culture ==
- Exterior shots of Northrop can be seen in the 1972 film The Heartbreak Kid.
- Northrop was used as a filming location for the 1994 film With Honors. In the film, Northrop stands in as the Widener Library at Harvard University.
- Exterior shots of Northrop can be seen in the 2014 film Dear White People.
- Northrop notably hosted the 7th annual NFL Honors awards show prior to Super Bowl LII in 2018. The event was televised on NBC.

== Notable concerts ==
- Igor Stravinsky
- Louis Armstrong
- Leonard Bernstein – 1945; 1947
- Marian Anderson
- Ella Fitzgerald
- The Norman Luboff Choir – 1963
- Van Cliburn – 1968
- Grateful Dead – 1971
- Peter, Paul and Mary
- Pete Seeger
- Joni Mitchell – 1976
- Carole King
- Bob Marley – 1978; 1979
- Elton John – 1979
- Frank Zappa – 1981; 1984
- Bette Midler – 1983
- Depeche Mode – 1988
- James Taylor – 1986; 2002
- The B-52s – 1990
- Aretha Franklin – 1992
- G3 Tour Steve Vai, Joe Satriani and Eric Johnson – 1997
- Bruce Springsteen – 1996; 2005
- Sonny Rollins – 1998
- Kenny G
- Dolly Parton
- Barry Manilow
- Prince – 2000
- Van Morrison – 2004; 2007
- Sheryl Crow
- John Mellencamp
- Paul Simon – 2006
- Neil Young – 2007; 2019
- Bob Dylan – 2008
- John Legend – 2008; 2017
- Kraftwerk – 2015
- Iggy Pop – 2016
- Patti Smith – 2017
- Diana Ross – 2017
- Thom Yorke – 2018
- Anna Lapwood – 2024

== Other notable events ==
- Mary Wigman – January 12, 1932
- Langston Hughes – 1935
- Arnold Toynbee – 1955
- Martin Luther King Jr. – October 16, 1959; January 28, 1963
- Robert Frost
- Metropolitan Opera – multiple dates
- Buckminster Fuller – 1973
- Alvin Ailey, American Ballet Theatre, and New York City Ballet – multiple dates
- Martha Graham
- Mikhail Baryshnikov
- Robin Williams – April 16, 2002
- The Dalai Lama
- Presidents Jimmy Carter, George H. W. Bush, Bill Clinton
- Former U.S. Vice President Walter Mondale and former President of Ireland Mary Robinson – October 20, 2001
- Supreme Court Justices Antonin Scalia, Sonia Sotomayor, John Roberts, Elena Kagan, and Sandra Day O'Connor
- Sherman Alexie
- NFL Honors – February 3, 2018
- Jane Goodall
- Gloria Steinem
- Walter Mondale memorial service, featuring President Joe Biden, Minnesota Governor Tim Walz, and Senators, Amy Klobuchar and Tina Smith – May 1, 2022
- Keith Ellison campaign rally, featuring Bernie Sanders and Ilhan Omar – October 7, 2022
- 2023 Robert A. Stein '61 Lecture, featuring Supreme Court Justice Amy Coney Barrett – October 16, 2023

== Photo gallery ==
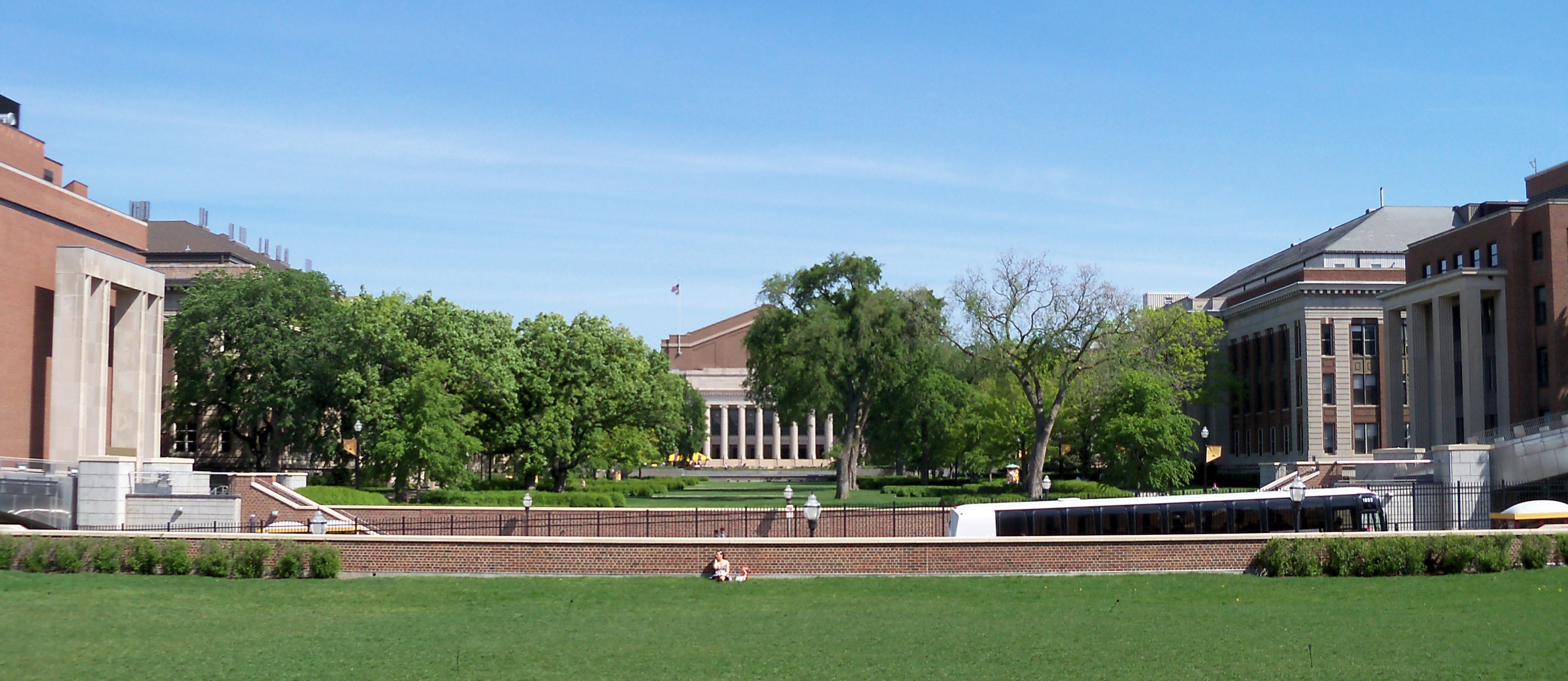
Northrop as seen from the front lawn of Coffman Memorial Union

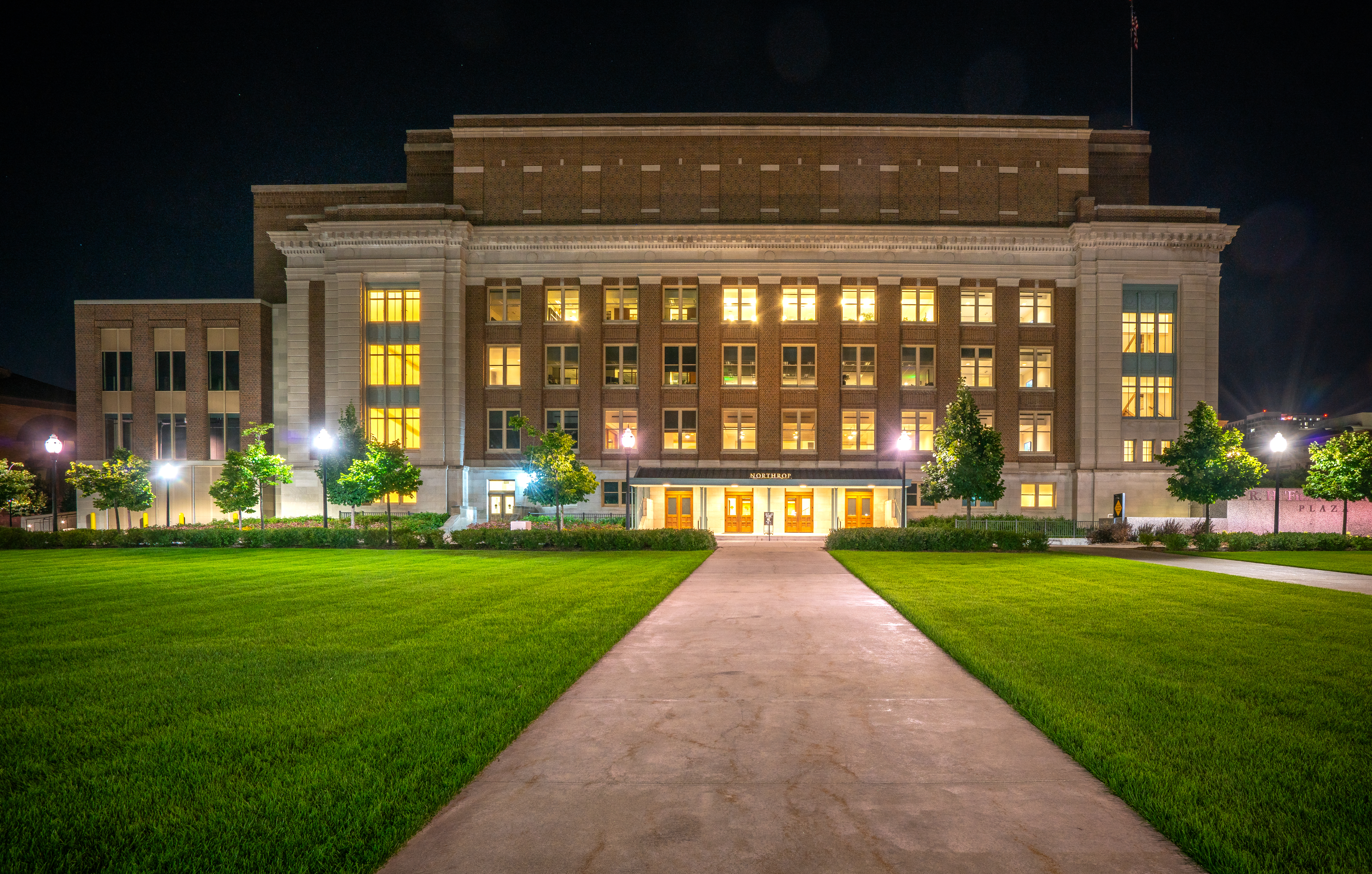
The western facade at night

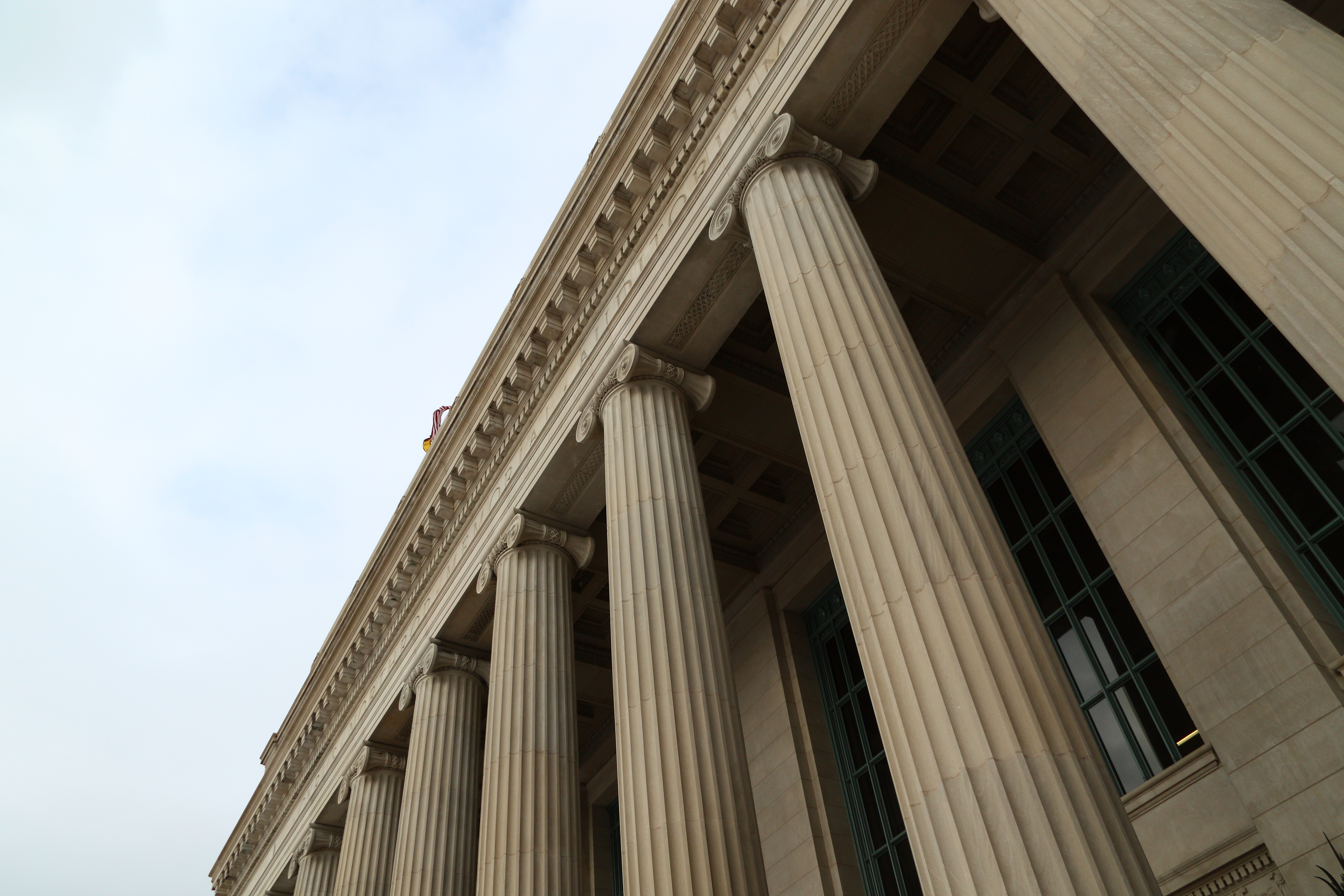
Exterior columns

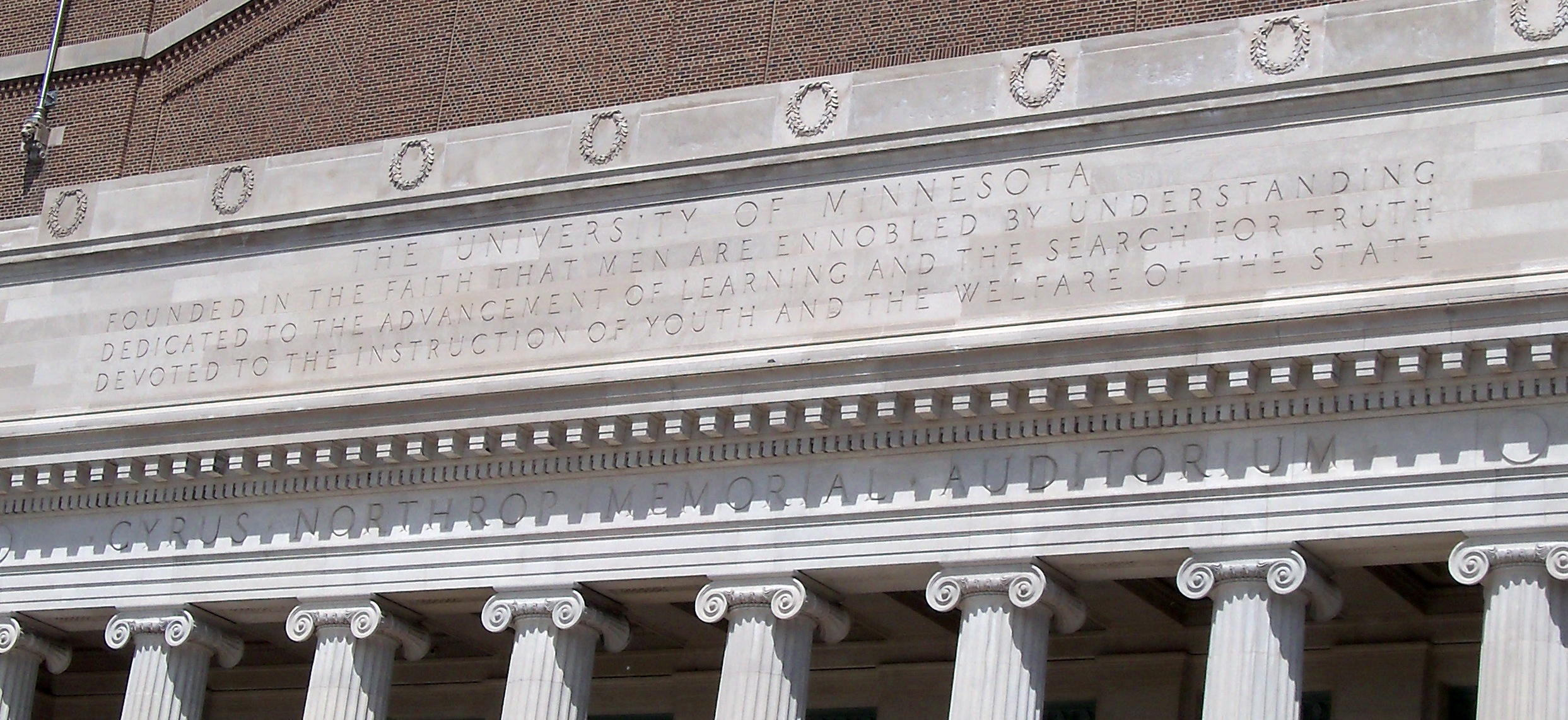
Front inscription

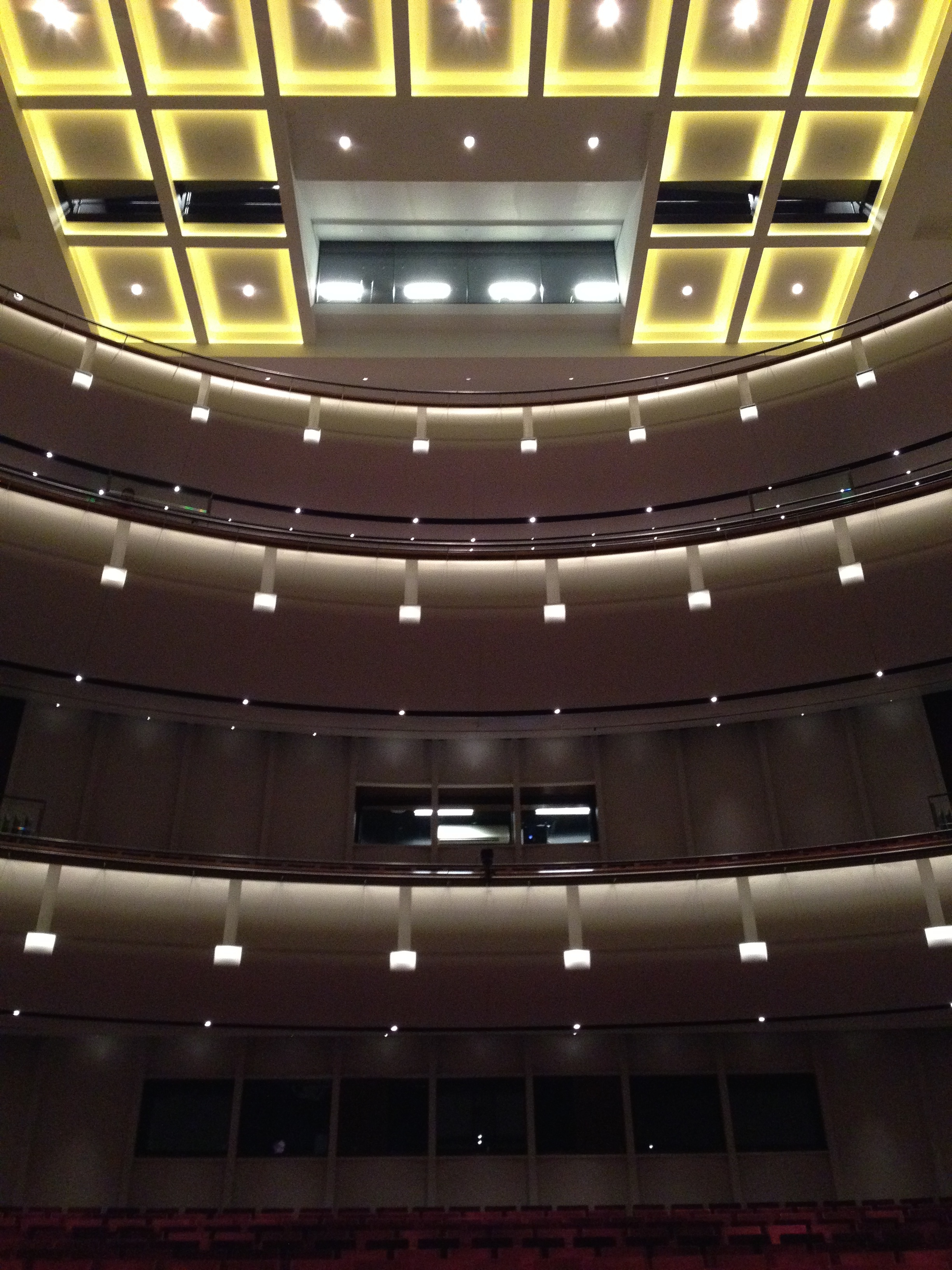
Carlson Family Stage

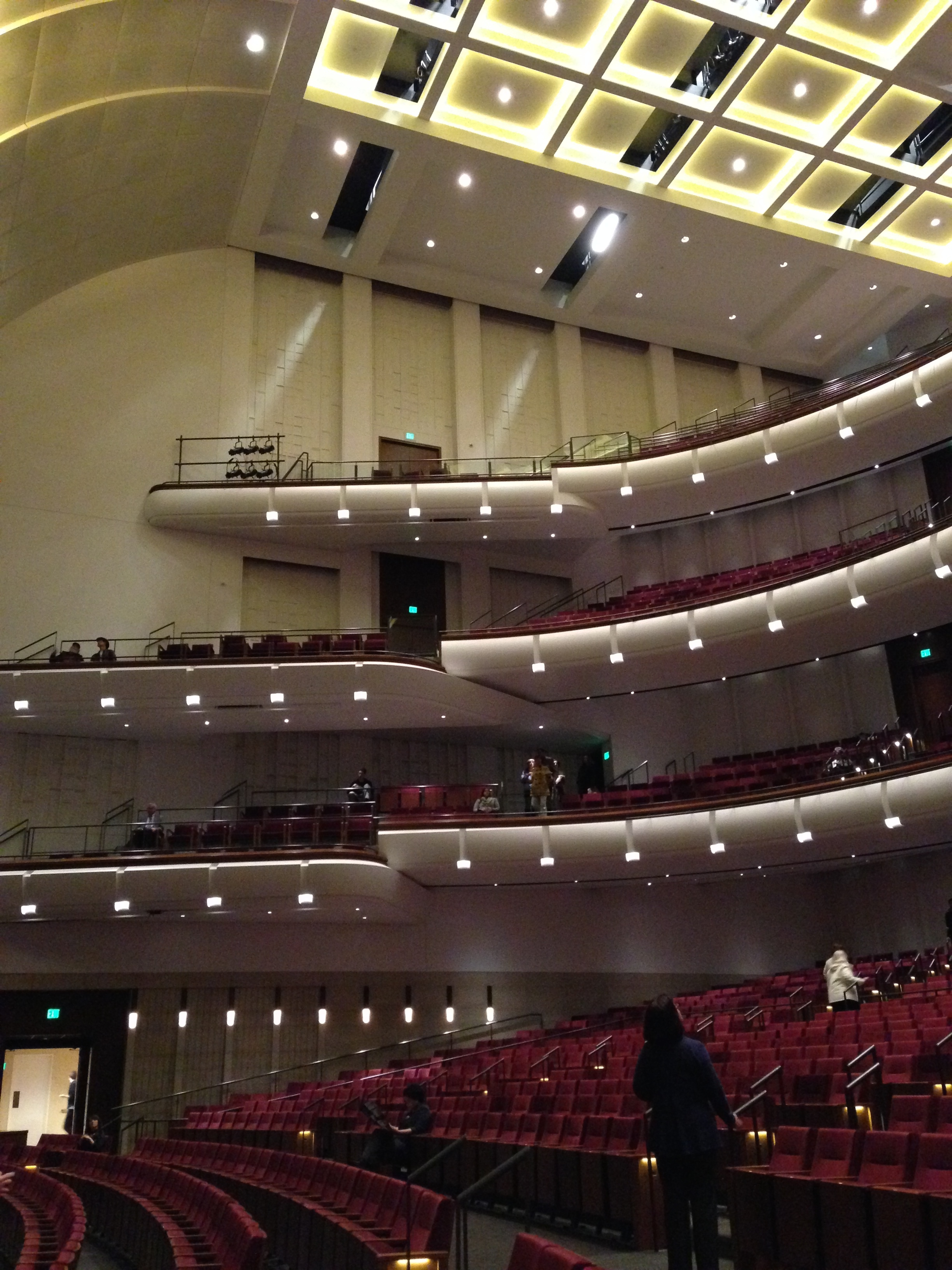
Carlson Family Stage

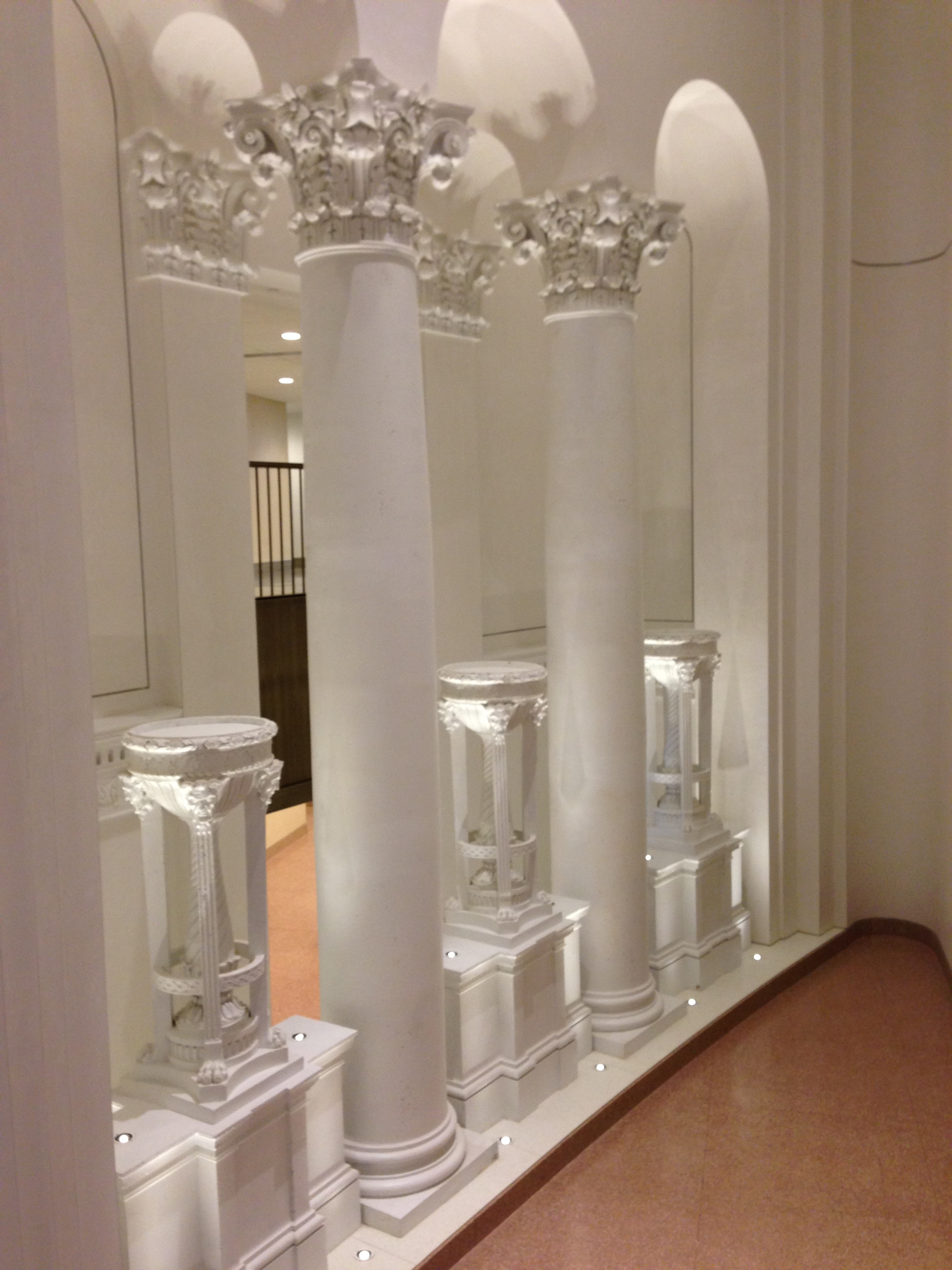
Interior columns

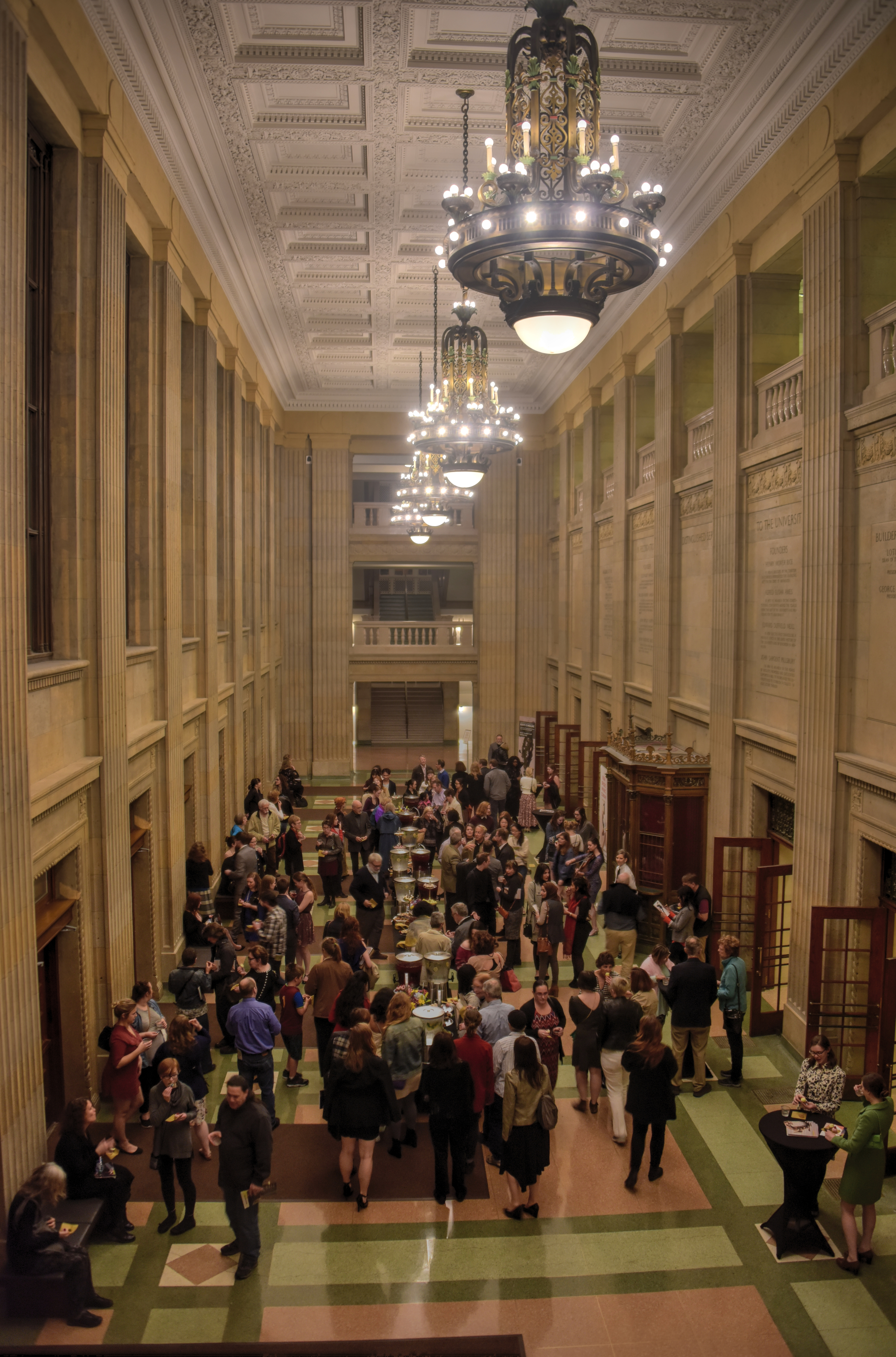
Memorial Hall

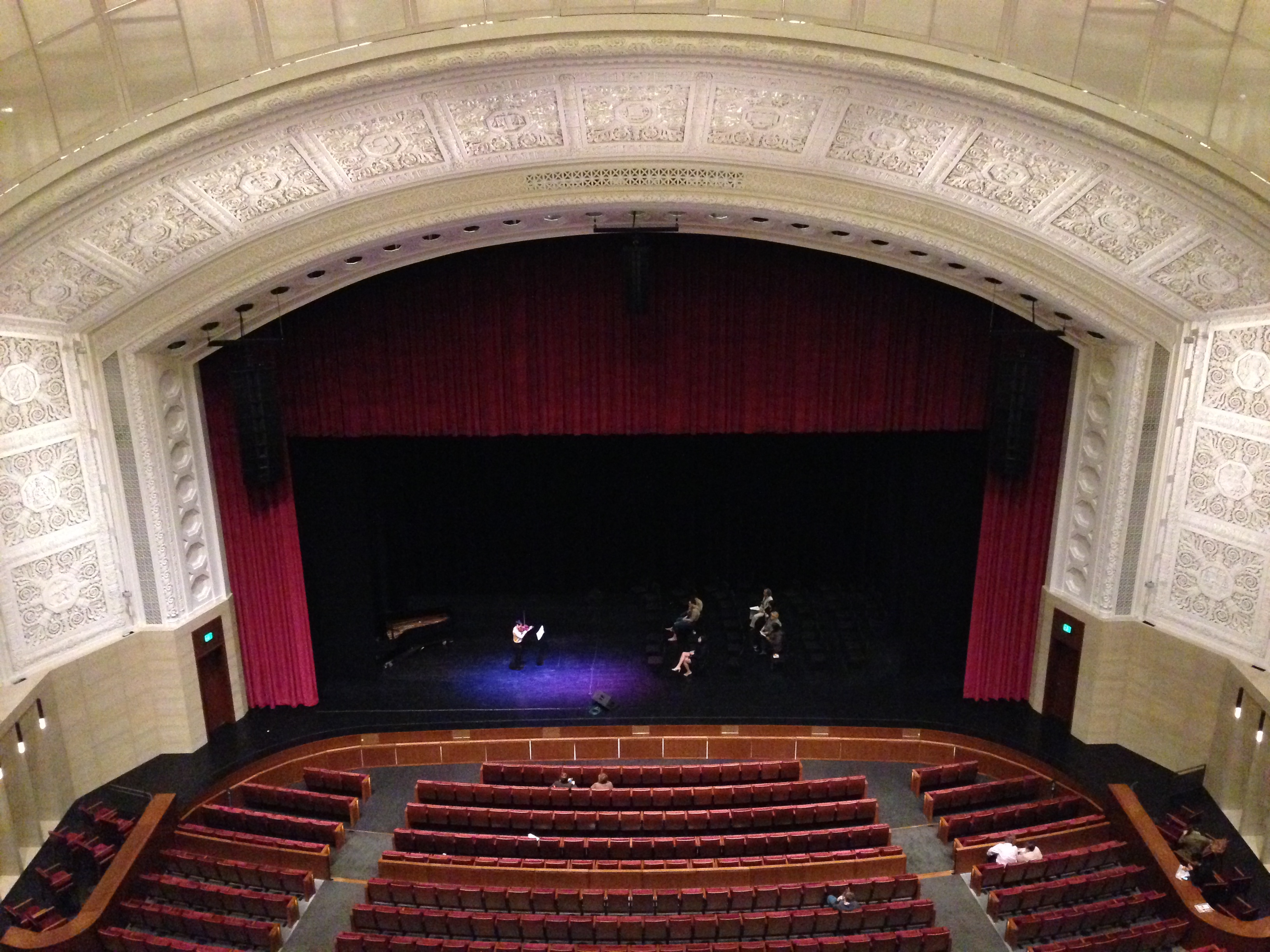
Proscenium arch

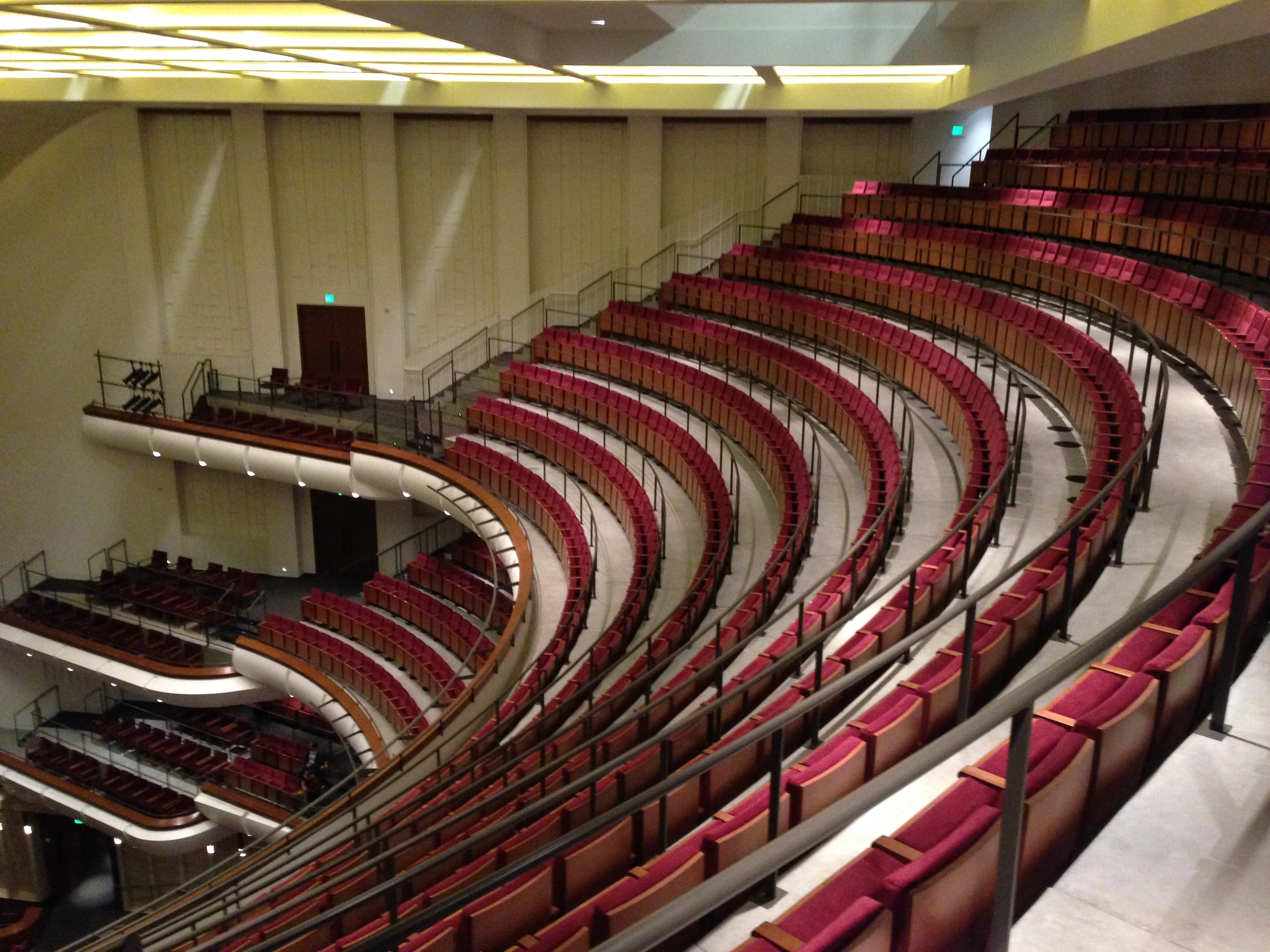
Gallery Circle

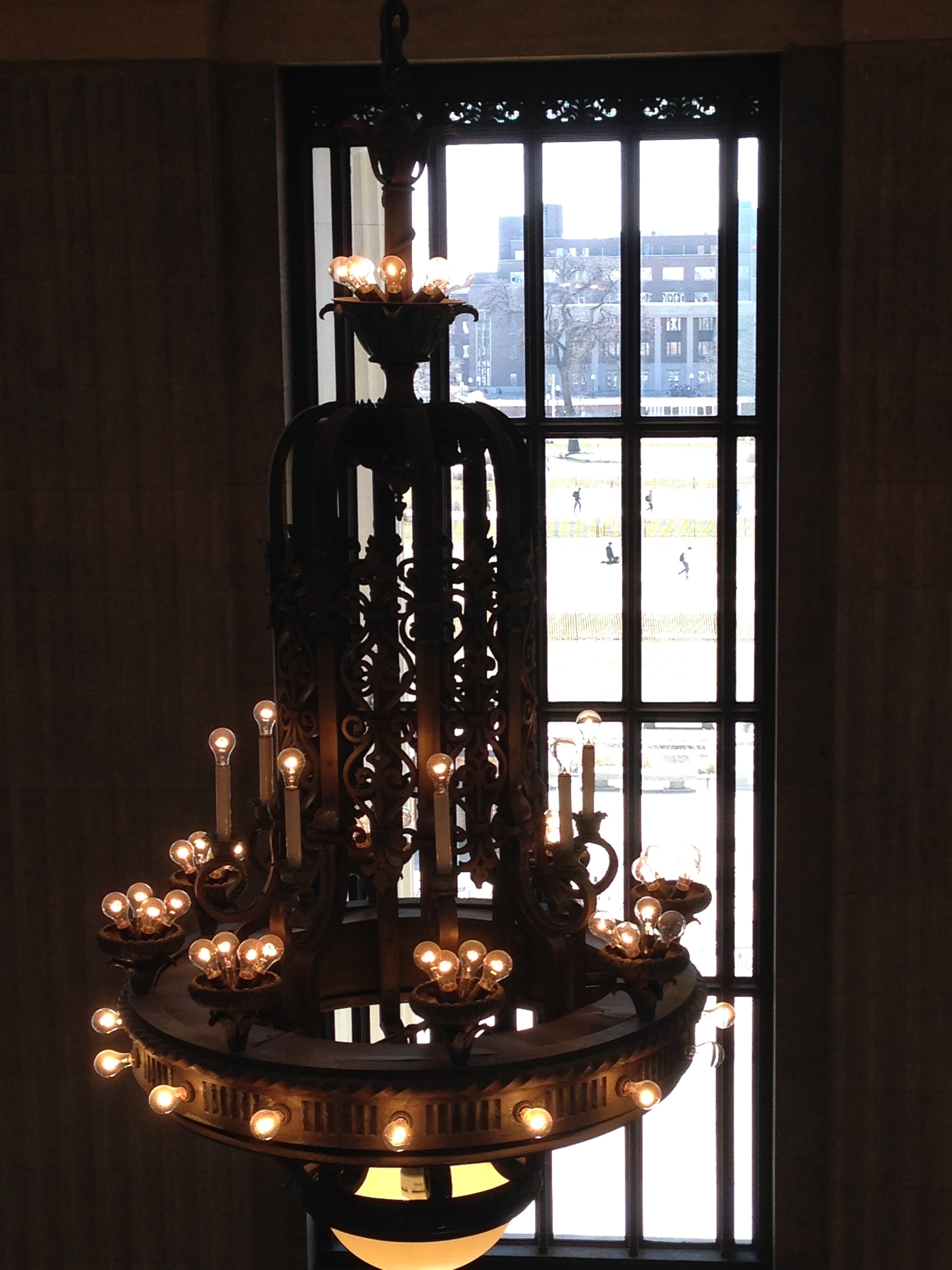
Chandelier
