= Minnesota Home School for Girls =

- Minnesota Home School for Girls Historic District
- U.S. National Register of Historic Places
- U.S. Historic district
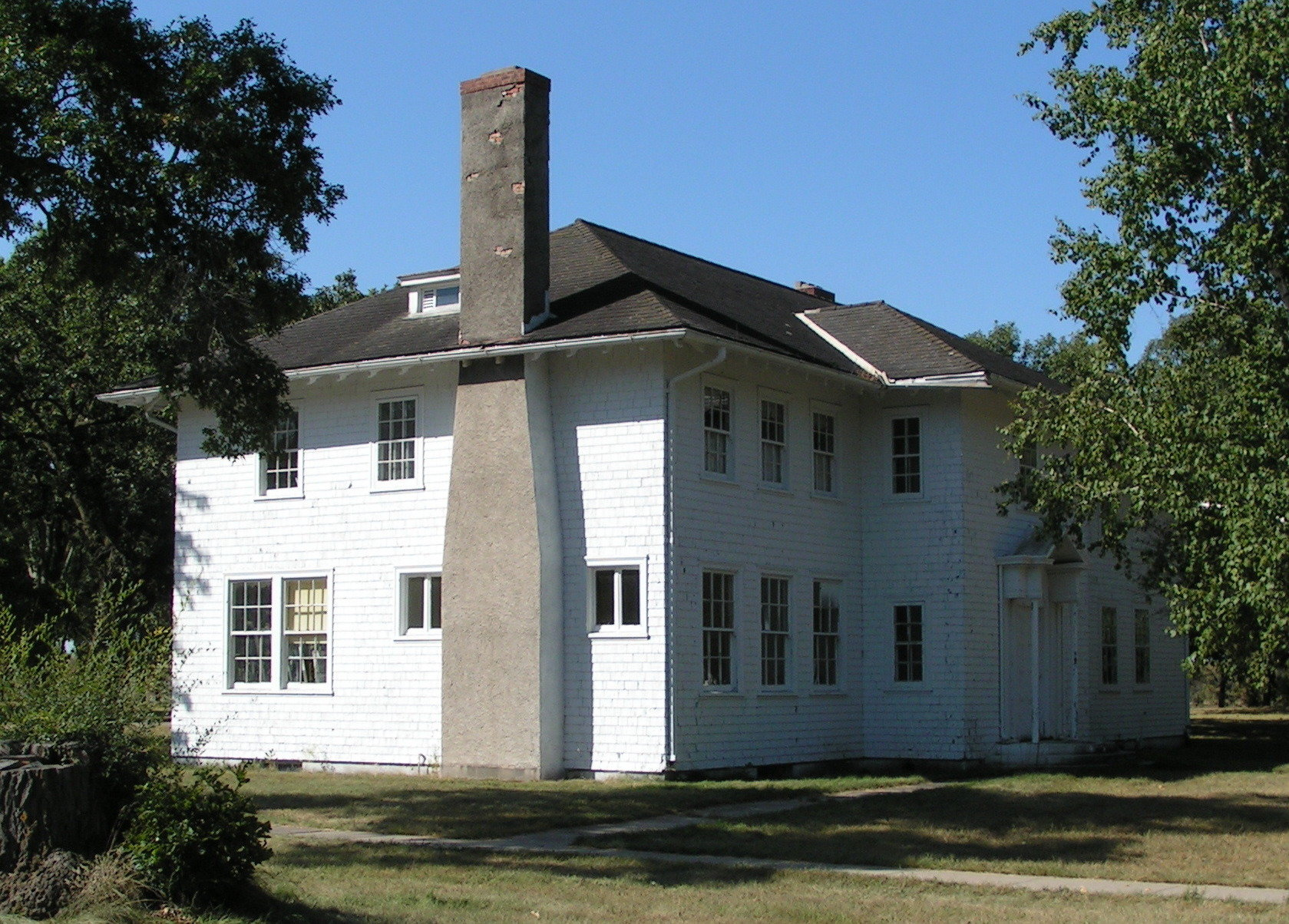
- The 1916 Mary Lyon Annex at the Minnesota Home School for Girls

- Location within Minnesota Location within the United States
- Location: 310 U.S. Route 71, Sauk Centre, Minnesota
- Coordinates: 45°45′7″N 94°56′47″W
- Area: 83 acres (34 ha)
- Built: 1911–35
- Architect: Clarence H. Johnston Sr.
- Architectural style: Neoclassical, Colonial Revival
- NRHP reference No.: 88003090
- Added to NRHP: January 19, 1989

The Minnesota Home School for Girls was a reformatory in Sauk Centre, Minnesota, United States. It was Minnesota's first single-sex reformatory for girls from its establishment in 1911 to 1967, when it switched to a coeducational model and shortened its name to the Minnesota Home School. The facility closed in 1999. The campus was designed on the Cottage Plan, with dispersed buildings in a bucolic setting, by Minnesota state architect Clarence H. Johnston Sr. The site has been converted to a veteran care center called Eagle's Healing Nest.

The campus was listed on the National Register of Historic Places in 1989 as the Minnesota Home School for Girls Historic District for its state-level significance in the themes of architecture and social history. It was nominated for being the first Minnesota state facility designed to treat female juvenile delinquents, for embodying the Cottage Plan theory of institutional design, and for Johnston Sr.

== Architecture ==
Each of the buildings on the campus is described as either contributing or non-contributing, with the contributing buildings perceived as having historical significance. The contributing buildings include the Alcott Cottage; the Richard Cottage; the Stowe Cottage; the Sullivan Cottage; Morse Hall; the chapel; Lind Cottage; Sinclair Lewis Hall; Evers Cottage; the equipment garage; the horse barn; the machine shed; Mary Lyon Annex; Mary Lyon School; Pettit Cottage; the maintenance building; the chapel garage; the lake cottage; and the root cellar. Conversely, the non-contributing buildings include the fine arts building; the Tekakitha Cottage; the DuBois Cottage; Senator Popp Building; the bungalow garage; and the storage garage.

The subject property is further described as significant as it represents the Cottage Plan of state institutional design, as well as the work of Clarence H. Johnston Sr., a prolific Saint Paul architect in the first 30 years of the 20th century. The buildings of the Home School were constructed according to the Cottage System of Institutional Care, which was a design theory used by state hospitals and mental asylums in the late 19th century. The system called for the institutions to be built away from the populace in a rural area to create a private, tranquil atmosphere, with farm operations often becoming an integral part of the property. The original property was gradually expanded so that by 1936 it consisted of 512 acres (207 ha) of land, which exceeds the current land area.

== See also ==
- National Register of Historic Places listings in Stearns County, Minnesota
