= Salvation Army Women's Home and Hospital =

- U.S. National Register of Historic Places
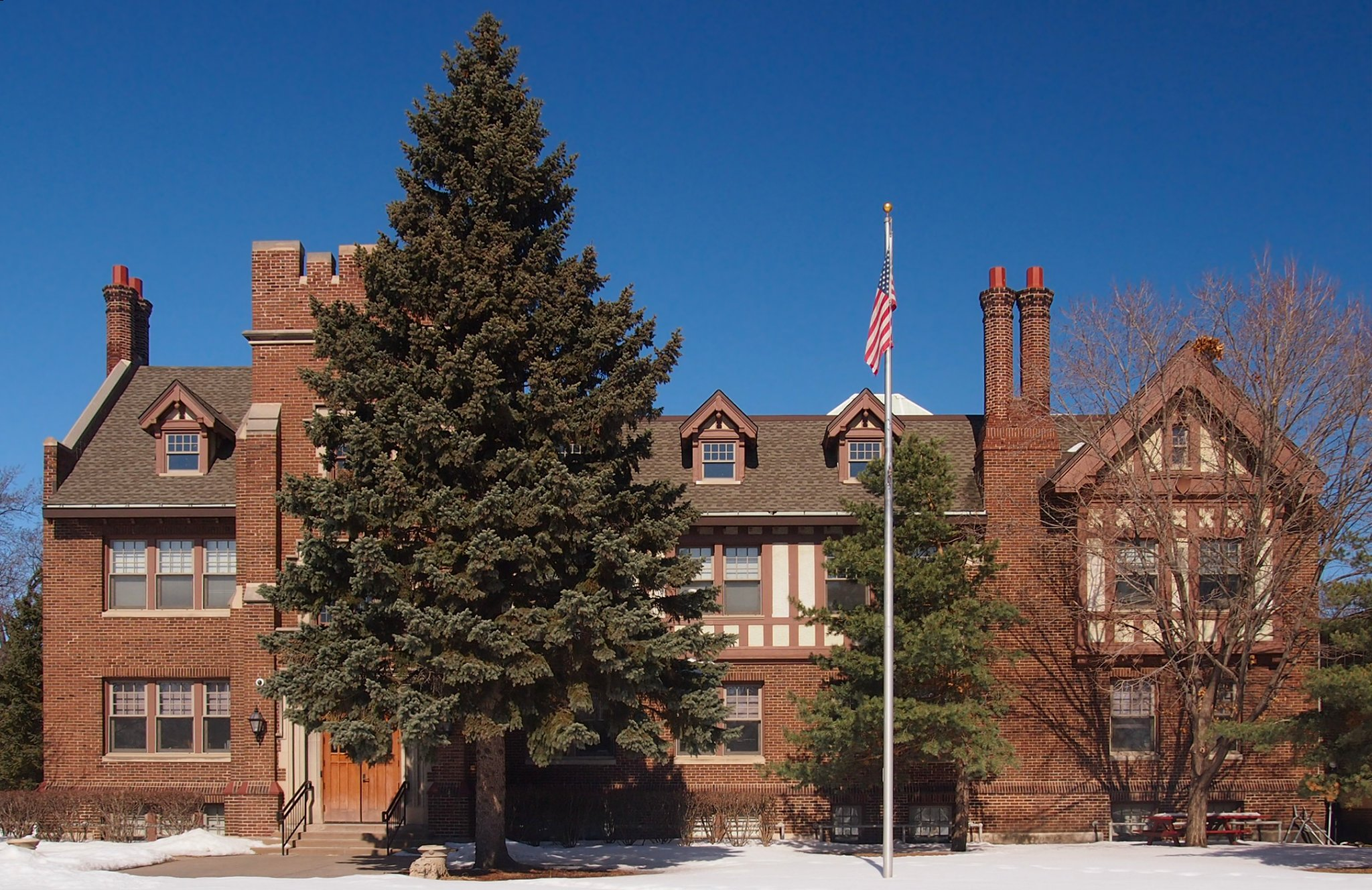
- The Salvation Army Women's Home and Hospital from the south

- Location within Minnesota Location within the United States
- Location: 1471 Como Avenue West; Saint Paul, Minnesota
- Coordinates: 44°58′41″N 93°9′46″W
- Built: 1912
- Architect: Clarence H. Johnston, Sr.
- Architectural style: Tudor Revival
- NRHP reference No.: 83000938
- Added to NRHP: February 10, 1983

The Salvation Army Women's Home and Hospital, now The Salvation Army's Booth Brown House, is a 1912 brick Tudor Revival style building designed by Clarence H. Johnston, Sr. in Saint Paul, Minnesota, United States. The Salvation Army originally used it to provide housing and hospital care for unwed mothers and their children. In 1971 its focus changed to helping young women with behavioral or emotional issues. The facility now serves homeless and transitional youth. The building was listed on the National Register of Historic Places on February 10, 1983 for its architecture and its significance in religion, humanitarianism, and women's history.
