= Manhattan Building (Saint Paul, Minnesota) =

- U.S. National Register of Historic Places
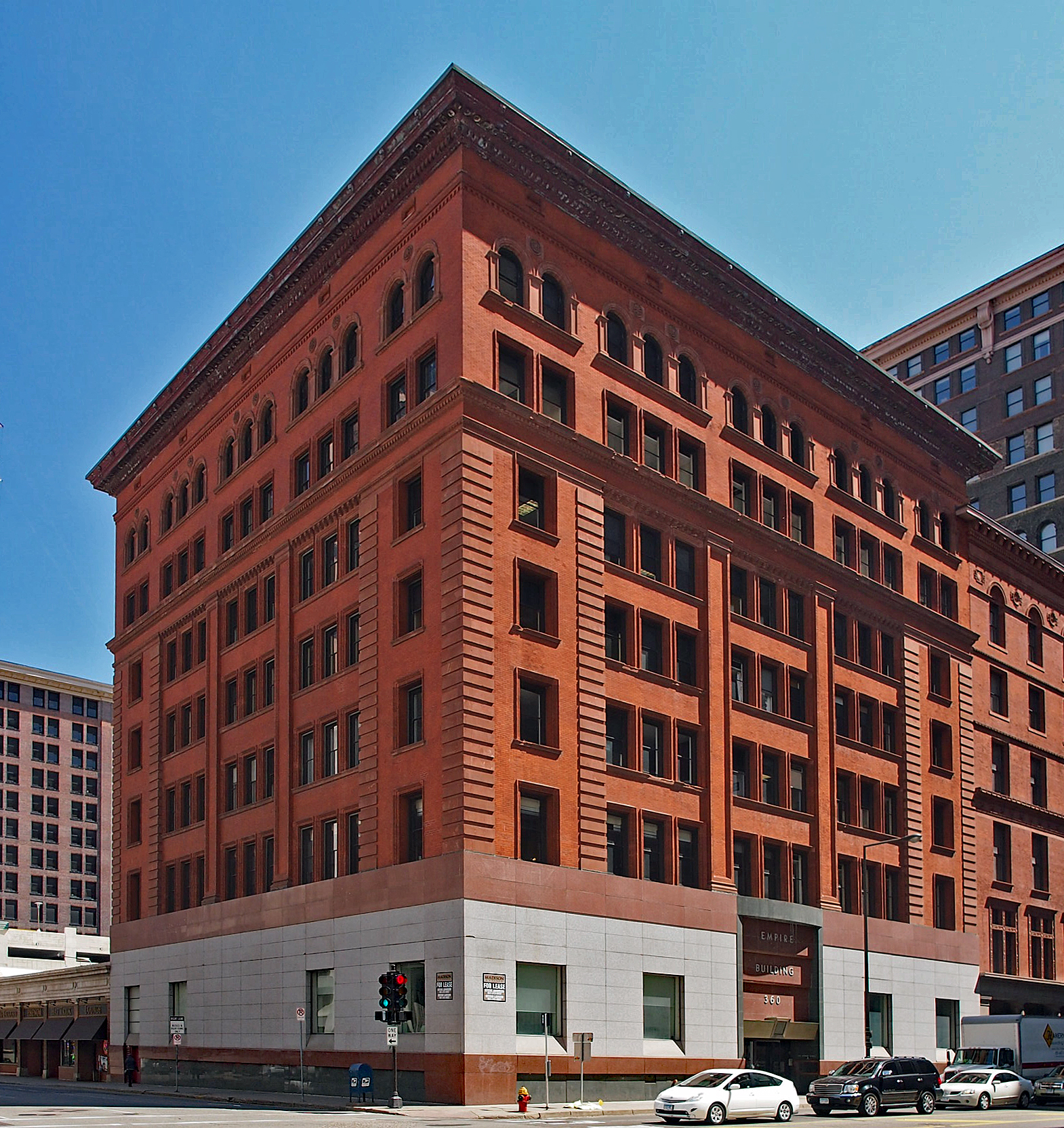
- The Manhattan Building from the west
- Interactive map of Manhattan Building
- Location: 360 N. Robert Street, Saint Paul, Minnesota
- Coordinates: 44°56′50.5″N 93°5′25.5″W
- Area: Less than one acre
- Built: 1890
- Architect: Clarence H. Johnston, Sr.; Lauer Brothers
- Architectural style: Late 19th And 20th Century Revivals
- NRHP reference No.: 88001128
- Added to NRHP: June 22, 1988

The Manhattan Building (also known as the Capital Bank Building or the Empire Building) is a historic office and banking building located in Saint Paul, Minnesota.

== Description and history ==
The seven-story plus basement, Renaissance Revival style building was designed by Clarence H. Johnston, Sr. in 1889 and built in 1890. The exterior consists of Jacobsville Sandstone and pressed brick. The building stands at a height of 117 feet tall.

According to its NRHP designation, “From bottom to top, the building has only been altered with applied material on the first story. This was applied sometime in the 1950s by Toltz, King, and Day architects according to historical photos. The current (sic) owner intends to remove the applied panels and uncover the original first story.”

It was listed on the National Register of Historic Places on June 22, 1988.

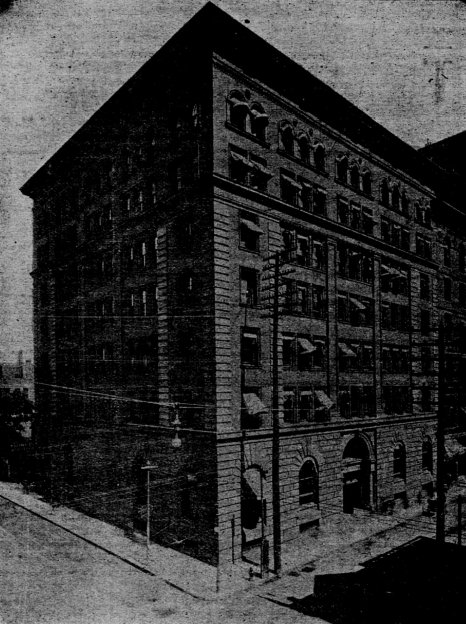
Building circa 1899
