= Olaf Lee House =

Historic house in Minnesota, United States

- U.S. National Register of Historic Places
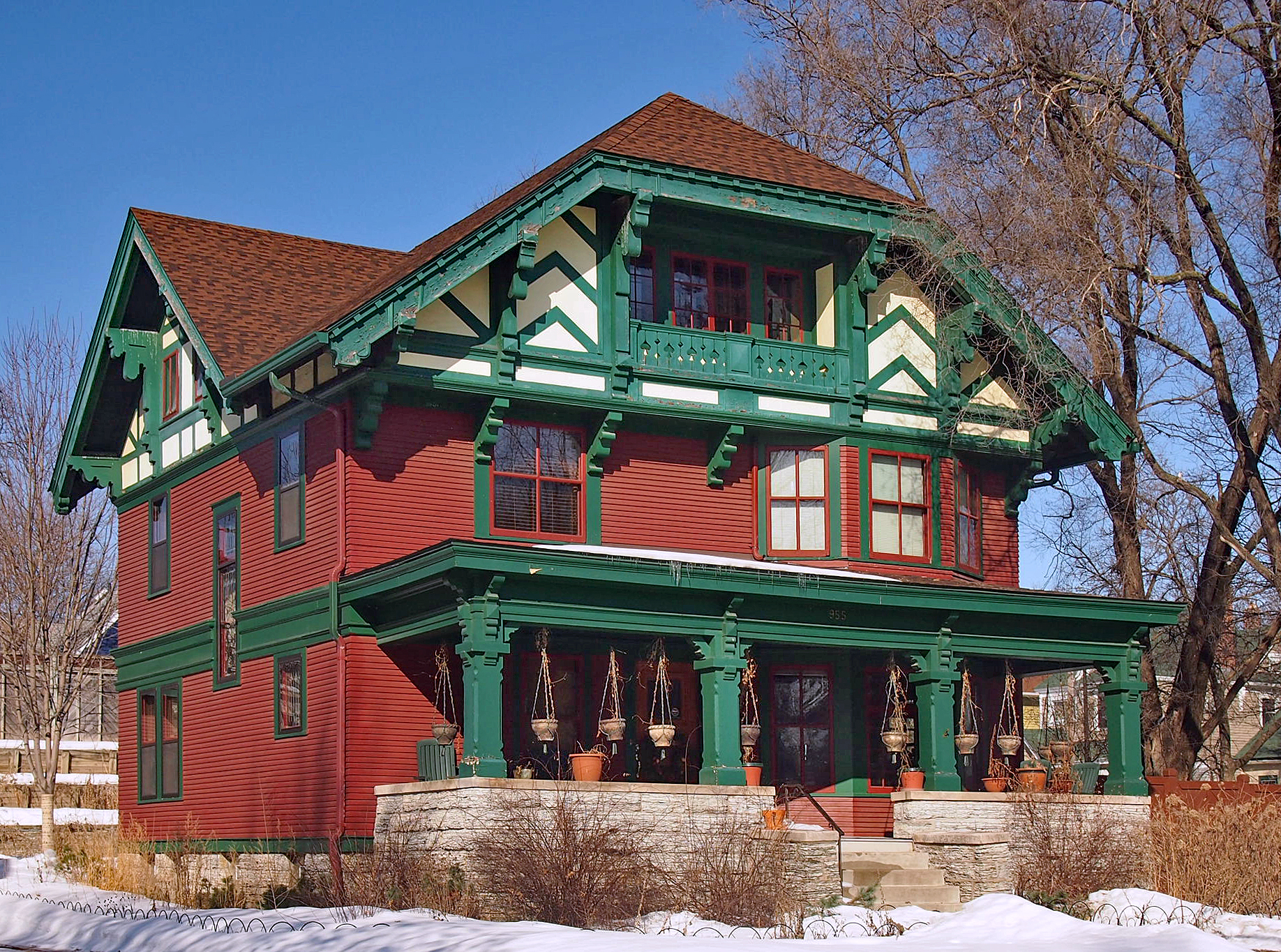
- The Olaf Lee House from the southeast

- Location within Minnesota Location within the United States
- Location: 955 Jessie Street North; Saint Paul, Minnesota
- Coordinates: 44°58′12″N 93°4′40″W
- Built: 1905
- Architect: Clarence H. Johnston, Sr.; Fred C. Norlander
- Architectural style: Bungalow/Craftsman
- NRHP reference No.: 84001670
- Added to NRHP: February 16, 1984

The Olaf Lee House was built in 1905 in Saint Paul, Minnesota, United States, and is listed on the National Register of Historic Places. The house is significant for its sophisticated Swiss Chalet and American Craftsman design by Clarence H. Johnston, Sr. The four-bedroom house is about 2,800 square feet (260 m^{2}) and is located in the Payne-Phalen neighborhood.
