= Clarence H. Johnston Sr. =

American architect

Clarence Howard Johnston Sr.
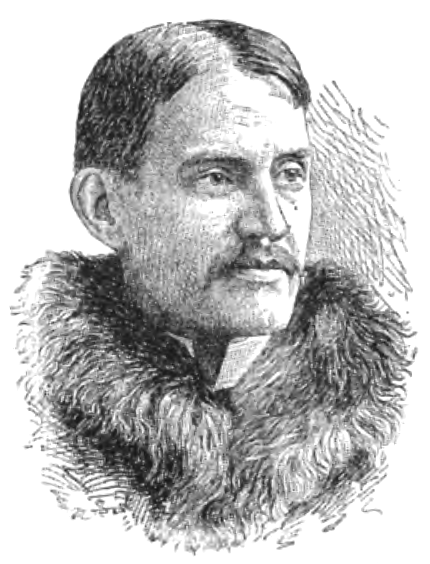
- Born: August 26, 1859; Waseca County, Minnesota
- Died: December 29, 1936 (aged 77); Saint Paul, Minnesota
- Occupation: Architect
- Awards: Minnesota State Architect (1901-1931); Fellow, American Institute of Architects; President, AIA Minnesota
- Buildings: Summit Terrace, Glensheen Mansion, Minnesota State Prison, Walter Library, Northrop Auditorium

Clarence Howard Johnston Sr. (August 26, 1859 – December 29, 1936) was an American architect who practiced in the US state of Minnesota during the late 1800s and early 1900s. Specializing in domestic, religious, and public architecture, he served as Minnesota State Architect from 1901 to 1931. He is considered one of the most prolific architects in the state's history.

== Early life ==
Johnston's parents, Alexander Johnston and Louise Johnston (née Buckhout), moved to Waseca County, Minnesota, in 1856, along with a few other families. They established a settlement named Okaman on the shores of Lake Elysian. Their first son, John Buckhout Johnston, was born in 1858, and became a prominent manufacturer and businessman. Clarence Johnston was born August 26, 1859. The family then moved to Wilton, which was then the county seat of Waseca County, and Alexander Johnston took over the publication of a local newspaper. In 1861 the family moved to Faribault. Their third child, Grace, was born March 2, 1862. They moved again, to Saint Paul, where their fourth child, Charles Albert, was born in 1864. After moving briefly to Hastings, the family returned to Saint Paul permanently in 1868. Alexander Johnston was then a reporter for the Daily Pioneer newspaper.

== Education and apprenticeship ==
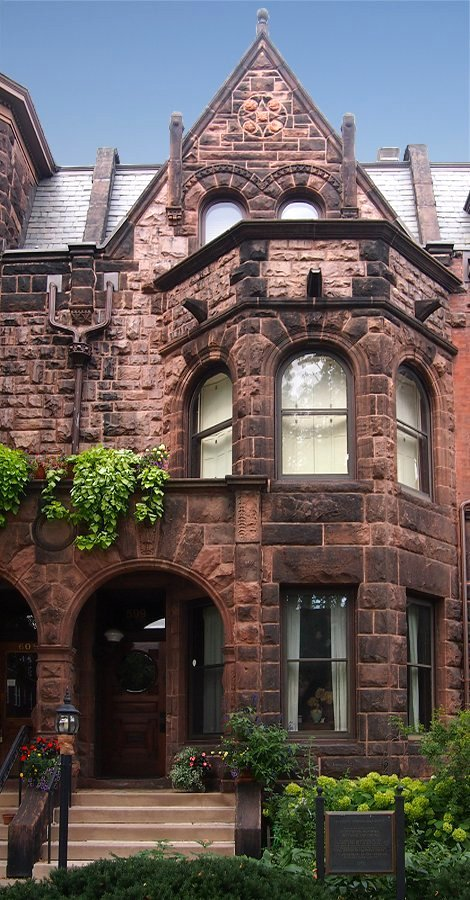
Summit Terrace (1889)

Johnston started attending Saint Paul High School in 1872 and took on a job as a clerk at the law firm of Rogers and Rogers. His mother died May 8, 1874, at the age of 42. That same year, Johnston quit his clerical job and began work at the firm of Abraham M. Radcliffe as a draughtsman. Radcliffe's firm was a local training ground for aspiring architects at the time. In September 1876, Cass Gilbert joined Radcliffe's firm as an apprentice, and Gilbert and Johnston soon became close friends.

In the fall of 1878, Gilbert and Johnston enrolled at the Massachusetts Institute of Technology (MIT). There they met James Knox Taylor, who had also grown up in Saint Paul and joined MIT as an architectural student a year earlier. Gilbert and Johnston, along with Taylor, had opted to take the special two-year course in architecture, rather than the full four-year degree-granting program. However, Johnston was forced to drop out after one term due to financial reasons. He moved back to Saint Paul and worked briefly at the firm of Edward Bassford, where the firm was more conscious of costs to the client in the design and construction process. This influenced Johnston to view economic constraints as a challenge to be solved by inventiveness, instead of being a restriction on his artistry. During these years, Gilbert and Johnston kept in touch through a large number of letters.

In January 1880, Cass Gilbert departed to Europe for an architectural tour. Gilbert wrote back to Johnston urging him to make a similar trip, but Johnston was preoccupied with a job offer from Herter Brothers in New York. One of the projects on which he worked during his tenure at Herter Brothers was J.P. Morgan's brownstone house on Madison Avenue at 36th Street. In the summer of 1880, Cass Gilbert returned from Europe and settled in New York, working for the firm of McKim, Mead & White. Gilbert and Johnston, along with their MIT classmate Francis Bacon, shared rooms at 40 Irving Place. That same year Johnston, Gilbert, Bacon, Taylor, and William A. Bates founded the Sketch Club, which later became the Architectural League of New York. Accounts vary on which members were actually the founders of the club.

== Career ==
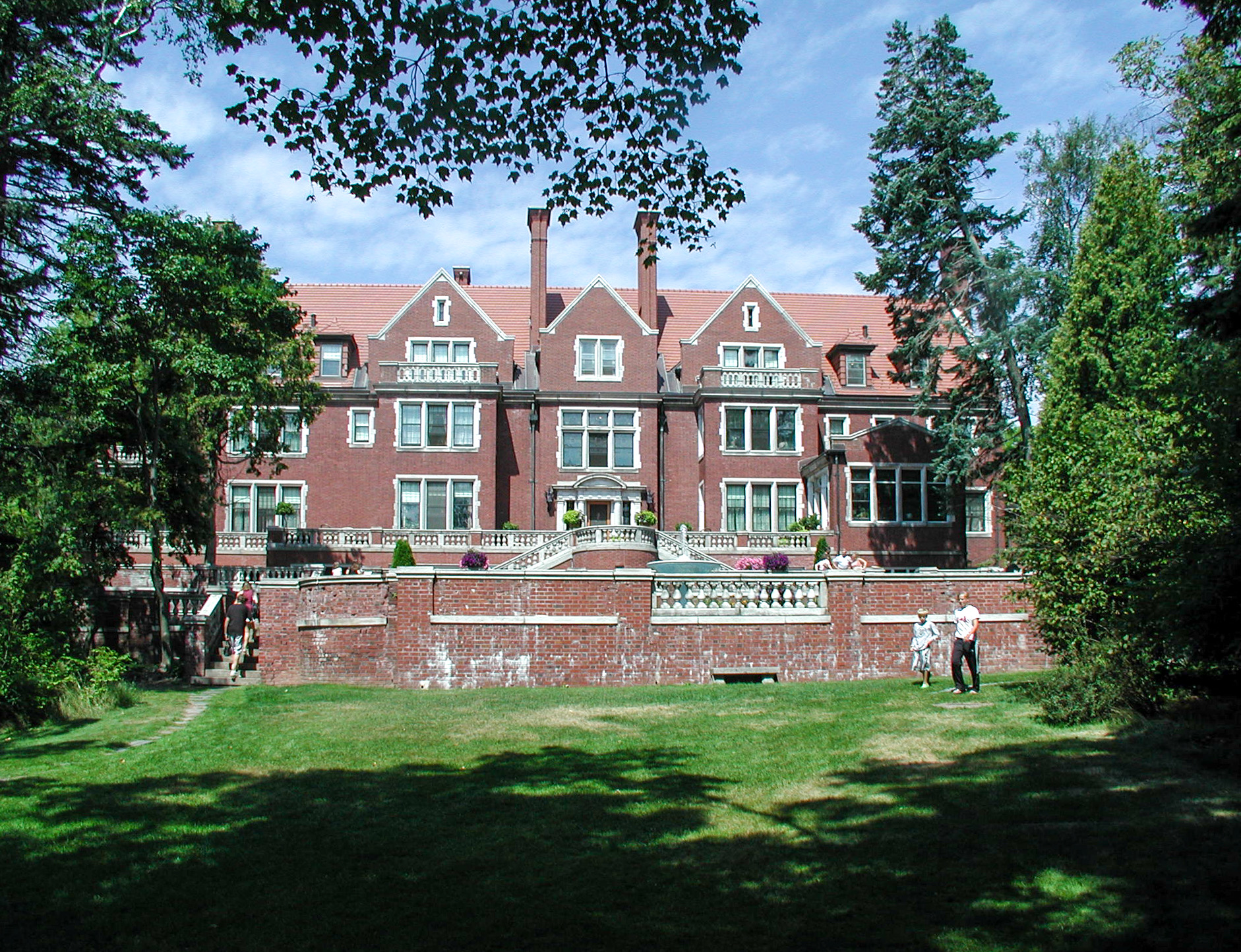
Glensheen (1908)

After finally traveling to Europe and the Asia Minor in February 1883, Johnston returned to the United States and established his own practice in Minnesota in 1886. He quickly gained a reputation as a respected domestic architect, designing countless homes and churches in Saint Paul, especially in the vicinity of Summit Avenue and Saint Paul's Hill District. In 1886 Johnston formed a partnership with William H. Willcox which lasted through 1890. In 1895 Johnston entered the competition to design the new Minnesota State Capitol, but lost to Cass Gilbert.

On May 22, 1901, the Minnesota State Board of Control, a body responsible for the construction and operation of all state-funded institutions, appointed Johnston as State Architect. As State Architect, Johnston prepared plans for the Minnesota State Prison, buildings at various state college campuses, hospitals, sanitoriums, and other public structures. Since state business was at the whims of the Minnesota Legislature and was not always consistent, he continued his private practice during this time. Retaining private commissions allowed him to operate his office continuously and receive a higher rate of return. Johnston continued as State Architect until 1931, when the State Division of Construction was dissolved.

Johnston was also architect for the Board of Regents of the University of Minnesota and drew plans for all the new buildings constructed on campus during his tenure.

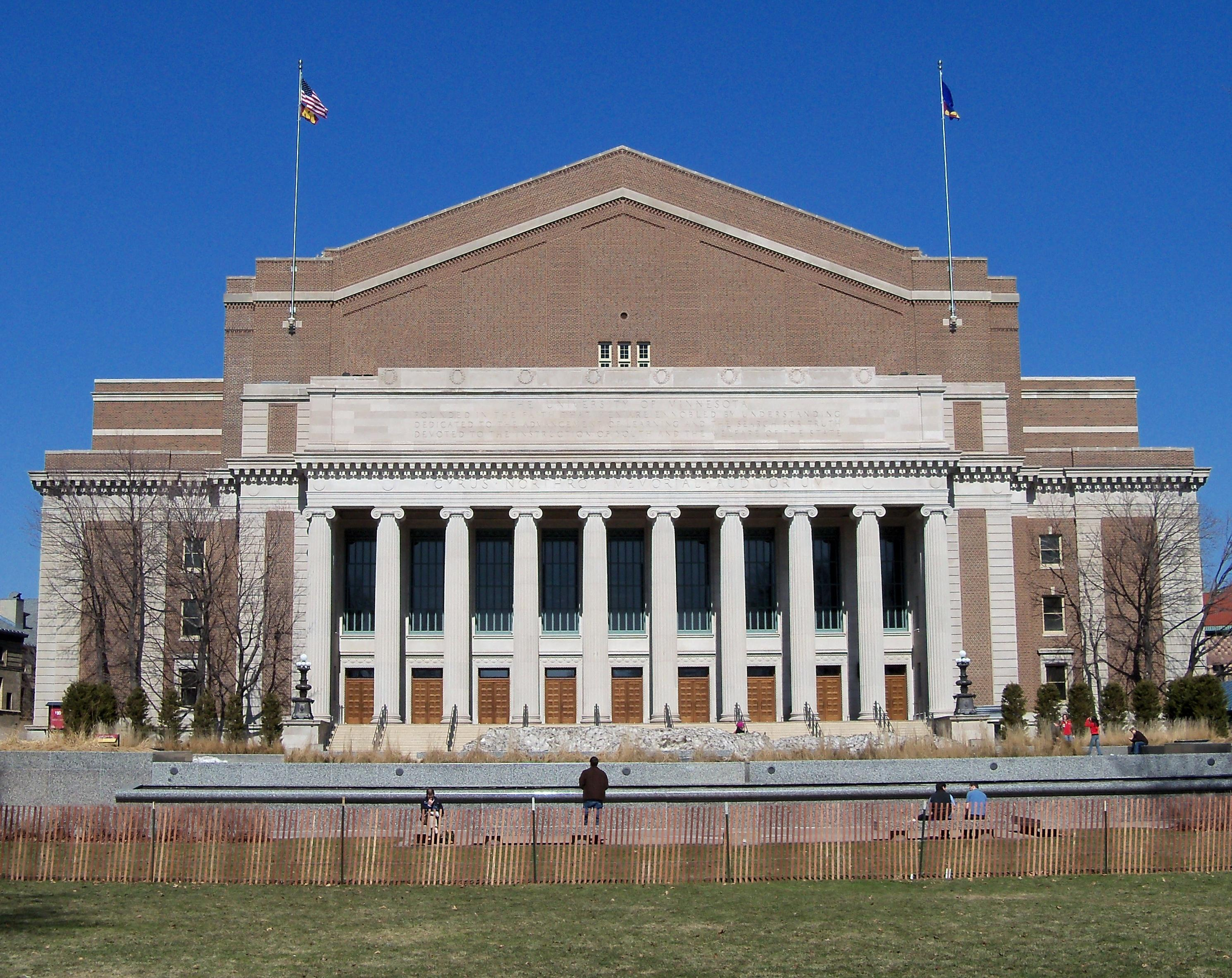
Northrop Auditorium (1929)

Johnston never officially retired, but backed off on his practice after the State Architect position dissolved in 1931. He died December 29, 1936.

== Family and personal life ==
Johnston married Mary "May" Thurston October 1, 1885. The couple had a total of five children.

Johnston's son, Clarence H. Johnston Jr, was also an architect. Taking charge of the Johnston firm upon his father's death, he went on to design Coffman Memorial Union and the old Bell Museum building at the University of Minnesota, among other projects.

Johnston was also the father of Jimmy Johnston, a noted amateur golfer.

== State Architect projects ==
The Minnesota State Board of Control was initially in charge of nine institutions. Johnston designed buildings at these following institutions:

Historic institution name	Modern name	Location	Buildings designed by Johnston
Hospital for the Insane	Minnesota Security Hospital	St. Peter	Main building additions and alterations, additional dormitories and wards
Rochester Asylum for the Insane	Closed 1982 and demolished	Rochester	Main building additions and alterations, dormitories and hospital buildings
State Asylum for the Insane, Anoka	Anoka Metro Regional Treatment Center	Anoka	Main building additions and alterations, several cottages for men and women, new administration building in 1919
Hastings Asylum for the Insane	Minnesota Veterans Home, Hastings	Hastings	Main building additions and alterations, several cottage and dormitory buildings
Training School for Boys	Minnesota Correctional Facility – Red Wing	Red Wing	Main building additions and alterations, auditorium/gymnasium, shop building, kitchen building, and cottages
Minnesota State Reformatory	Minnesota Correctional Facility – St. Cloud	St. Cloud	South wing completion, new administration building, cell houses D, E, and F, hospital
Minnesota State Prison	Minnesota Correctional Facility – Stillwater	Stillwater	Initial design of the new Bayport location authorized in 1905, administration building, four cellhouses, machinery factory/shops/foundry, warden and deputy warden's residences
Minnesota School for the Feeble-Minded	Closed 1998, subsumed by Minnesota Correctional Facility – Faribault	Faribault	Main building alterations and additions, many custodial buildings and cottages
University of Minnesota		Minneapolis campus	School of Mines Law Building (Pattee Hall) addition Main building (Folwell Hall) Ladies' dormitory (Sanford Hall) Main Engineering (Lind Hall) Medical School (Millard Hall) Institute of Anatomy (Jackson Hall) Experimental Engineering highway department addition Chemistry (Smith Hall) School of Mines (Appleby Hall) Elliot Hospital additions Ladies' gymnasium (Norris Hall) Biology Shevlin Hall addition School of Music (Scott Hall) Walter Library Mines Experiment Station Administration building (Morrill Hall) Minnesota Union (Nicholson Hall) additions Storehouse and Shops Building Electrical Engineering Botany Physics Law School (Fraser Hall) Field House (Williams Arena) Northrop Auditorium Pioneer Hall College of Dentistry (Owre Hall) Powell Hall Indoor sports building
University of Minnesota School of Agriculture	University of Minnesota, St. Paul campus	St. Paul campus	Boys' dormitory (Dexter Hall) Main building (Coffey Hall) Dairy cattle barn Ladies' dormitory (Meredith Hall) Dining hall (North Hall) addition Ladies' dormitory (Brewster Hall) Horse barn Agricultural Engineering Home Economics (McNeal Hall) Gymnasium Agronomy Seed House Veterinary barn Plant Pathology Dairy husbandry (Haecker Hall) Plant Industries (Snyder Hall)
First State Normal School of Minnesota	Winona State University	Winona	Library, Morey Hall, Phelps Hall, Shepard Hall, College Hall
Mankato Normal School	Minnesota State University, Mankato	Mankato	
Third State Normal School	St. Cloud State University	St. Cloud	Lawrence Hall (1905), Old Model School, Riverview, Shoemaker Hall, Eastman Hall
Moorhead Normal School	Minnesota State University Moorhead	Moorhead	
Duluth Normal School	University of Minnesota Duluth	Duluth	
Minnesota State Public School for Dependent and Neglected Children	Closed 1970, now preserved as a museum	Owatonna	South wing, power plant, and some dormitory buildings
State School for the Blind	Minnesota State Academy for the Blind	Faribault	
State School for the Deaf	Minnesota State Academy for the Deaf	Faribault	
Some buildings of the Minnesota State Fair		St. Paul	Cattle pavilion, grandstand repairs and reinforcing, warehouse

While Johnston was State Architect, the Minnesota State Board of Control added the following institutions to its governance:

Historic institution name	Date added	Modern name	Location	Buildings designed by Johnston
Minnesota State Sanatorium for Consumptives	1905	Ah-Gwah-Ching State Health Care Facility, razed in 2010	Walker	
Thirteen county sanatoriums	1913		Various counties	
State Hospital for Indigent, Crippled, and Deformed Children	1907	Renamed Gillette State Hospital for Crippled Children in 1925; now part of Gillette Children's Specialty Healthcare	Near Lake Phalen in St. Paul	Main complex, several service buildings, and Michael Dowling Hall (school)
Willmar Hospital Farm for Inebriates	1907	Willmar Regional Treatment Center, closed in 2007	Willmar	
Home School for Girls	1907	Minnesota Correctional Facility-Sauk Centre; closed in 1999	Sauk Centre	
Women's Reformatory	1918	Minnesota Correctional Facility – Shakopee	Shakopee	
Minnesota Colony for Epileptics	1924	Cambridge State Hospital, closed 1999	Cambridge	
Ramsey County Preventorium	1928	Became Lake Owasso Children's Home in 1955; closed 1976	North of St. Paul	
Agricultural school added to Northwest Agricultural Experiment Station	1905	University of Minnesota Crookston	Crookston	School of agriculture and boys' dormitory Boys' dormitory and dining hall (Stephens Hall) Farm mechanics building (Owen Hall) Library and assembly hall (Kiehle Hall) Ladies' dormitory (Robertson Hall) Industrial building (possibly an addition to Owen Hall) Science building (Hill Building) (demolished 1959, replaced by a new Hill Hall) Boys' dormitory (Selvig Hall) Dining hall (Bede Hall), demolished 2004 Four-family cottage Health service Gymnasium
Agricultural school added to Northeast Agricultural Experiment Station	1905	Now part of Itasca Community College	Grand Rapids	School of agriculture, Bergh Hall, and Donovan Hall
West Central School of Agriculture	1910	University of Minnesota Morris	Morris	Ladies' dormitory (Camden Hall) Men's dormitory (Spooner Hall) Dining hall and gymnasium (Behmler Hall) Boys' dormitory (Blakely Hall) Main building (Agricultural Hall) Dormitory (Pine Hall) Gymnasium
South Agricultural Experiment Station	1912	University of Minnesota Waseca (now defunct)	Waseca	Superintendent's residence
Northeast Demonstration Farm and Experiment Station	1912	razed	Duluth	Institute Hall
Bemidji State Normal School	1918	Bemidji State University	Bemidji	Deputy Hall, Sanford Hall, training school wing and heating plant
Minnesota Historical Society building	1916-1918	Minnesota Judicial Center	St. Paul	
Minnesota State Office Building	1931-1932		St. Paul	

For all the institutions above, Clarence H. Johnston Sr. either designed new buildings, designed improvements to existing buildings, or both.

== Notable works ==
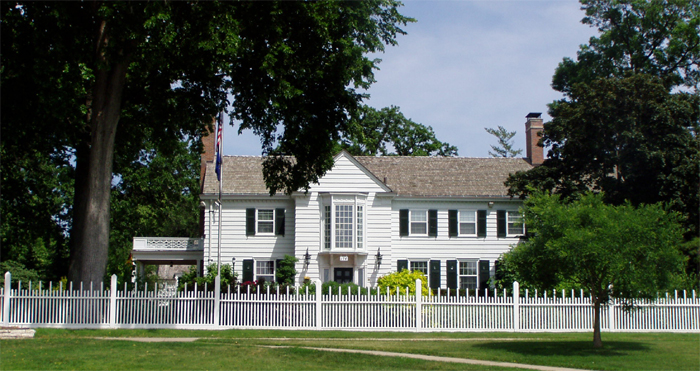
Eastcliff (1922), the University of Minnesota President's residence

=== University of Minnesota, Minneapolis Campus ===
- Child Development and Folwell Hall, part of the University of Minnesota Old Campus Historic District
- Collaborator with Cass Gilbert on the Northrop Mall
- Northrop Auditorium
- Walter Library
- Williams Arena

=== University of Minnesota, Saint Paul Campus ===
- Haecker Hall (Dairy Husbandry)
- Biosystems and Agricultural Engineering Building
- Coffey Hall
- McNeal Hall
- Eastcliff, the residence of the President of the University of Minnesota

=== Other buildings ===
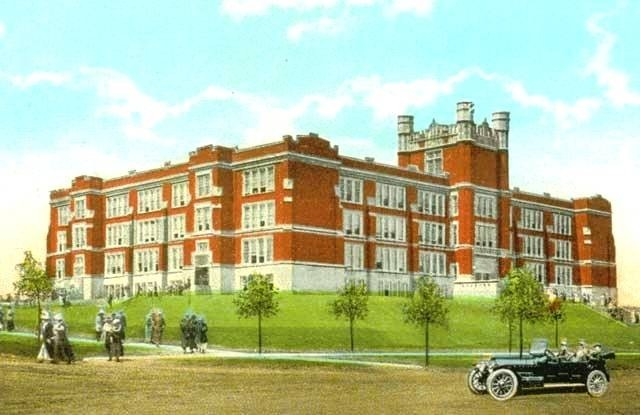
Saint Paul Central High School (1912–1980)

- Minnesota State Fair Grandstand
- Burbank–Livingston–Griggs House, 432 Summit Avenue, Saint Paul
- 976 Summit Ave., Saint Paul
- Pierce and Walter Butler House, 1345-1347 Summit Avenue, Saint Paul
- Henry Byllesby Row House, Saint Paul
- Saint Paul Academy, lower school building, formerly the Summit School for Girls
- Minnesota State Academy for the Deaf Administration Building, Faribault, Minnesota
- Glensheen Historic Estate, Duluth, Minnesota
- Duluth State Normal School buildings, now the University of Minnesota Duluth lower campus
- Several buildings of the University of Minnesota Morris, dating back to its foundation as West Central School of Agriculture and Experiment Station Historic District
- Saint Paul Central High School, 1912 building at Marshall Avenue and Lexington Parkway.
- Minnesota Humanities Center (Formerly Dowling Memorial Hall on the Gillette Children's Hospital Campus at Phalen Lake), 1924. Building at 987 Ivy Avenue East in Saint Paul, Minnesota
- Several buildings on the Saint Paul campus of Hamline University.
- City Hall Annex (Lowry Medical Arts Building).
- Trade and Commerce Building, 916 Hammond Avenue, Superior, Wisconsin.
- Farrar-Howes Houses, 596-604 Summit Avenue, Saint Paul, Minnesota
- Church of the Most Holy Trinity, Veseli, Minnesota
- Olaf Lee House, 955 N. Jessie St., Saint Paul
- Manhattan Building (St. Paul, Minnesota), 360 N. Robert St., Saint Paul
- Buildings within Red Wing Mall Historic District and Red Wing Residential Historic District, Red Wing, Minnesota
- Salvation Army Women's Home and Hospital, 1471 W. Como Ave., Saint Paul
- St. Mary's Hall, 4th St., NE and 4th Ave. NE, Faribault, Minnesota
