= Walter Library =

University of Minnesota library

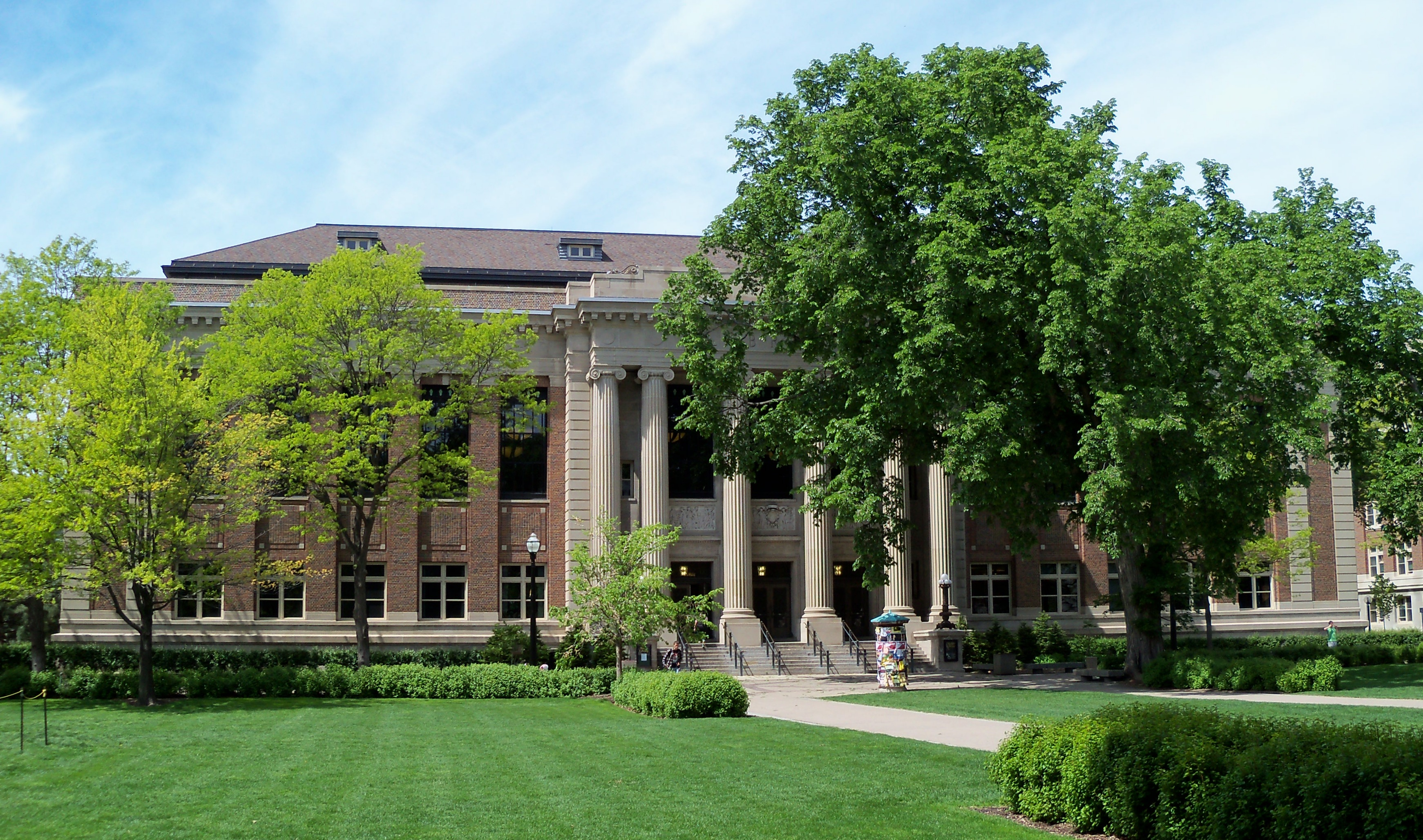
- Walter Library as viewed from Northrop Mall
- 44°58′31″N 93°14′10″W
- Location: 117 Pleasant Street SE; Minneapolis, MN 55455, United States
- Type: Academic library
- Scope: Science and Engineering
- Established: 1924
- Branch of: University of Minnesota Libraries

Other information
- Website: lib.umn.edu/walter

Walter Library is an academic library located on the East Bank campus of the University of Minnesota in Minneapolis, Minnesota. It currently houses the College of Science and Engineering library and dean's office, the Minnesota Supercomputing Institute, and The Toaster. Walter Library is situated along Northrop Mall, a grassy area at the center of campus that is bordered by the University's physics, mathematics, chemistry, and administration buildings, plus Northrop Auditorium.

== History ==
Walter Library was built between 1922 and 1924 for a total cost of $1.4 million. Designed by Minnesota State Architect Clarence H. Johnston, the building served as the university's primary library for much of the twentieth century. The library was named in honor of Frank Keller Walter in 1959. Walter, who had participated in the planning of the library, was the University of Minnesota Librarian from 1921 to 1943.

Planning for a major rehabilitation of Walter Library began in the early 1990s. Work began in 1999 and continued until 2002. While the building received many technical upgrades during the project, much of the work also involved historical restoration. The project, conducted by the architectural firm of Stageberg Beyer Sachs, was completed in December 2002 for a sum of $63.4 million.

Walter Library was formally listed in the National Register of Historic Places as a contributing property to the Northrop Mall Historic District in January 2018.

== Architecture ==
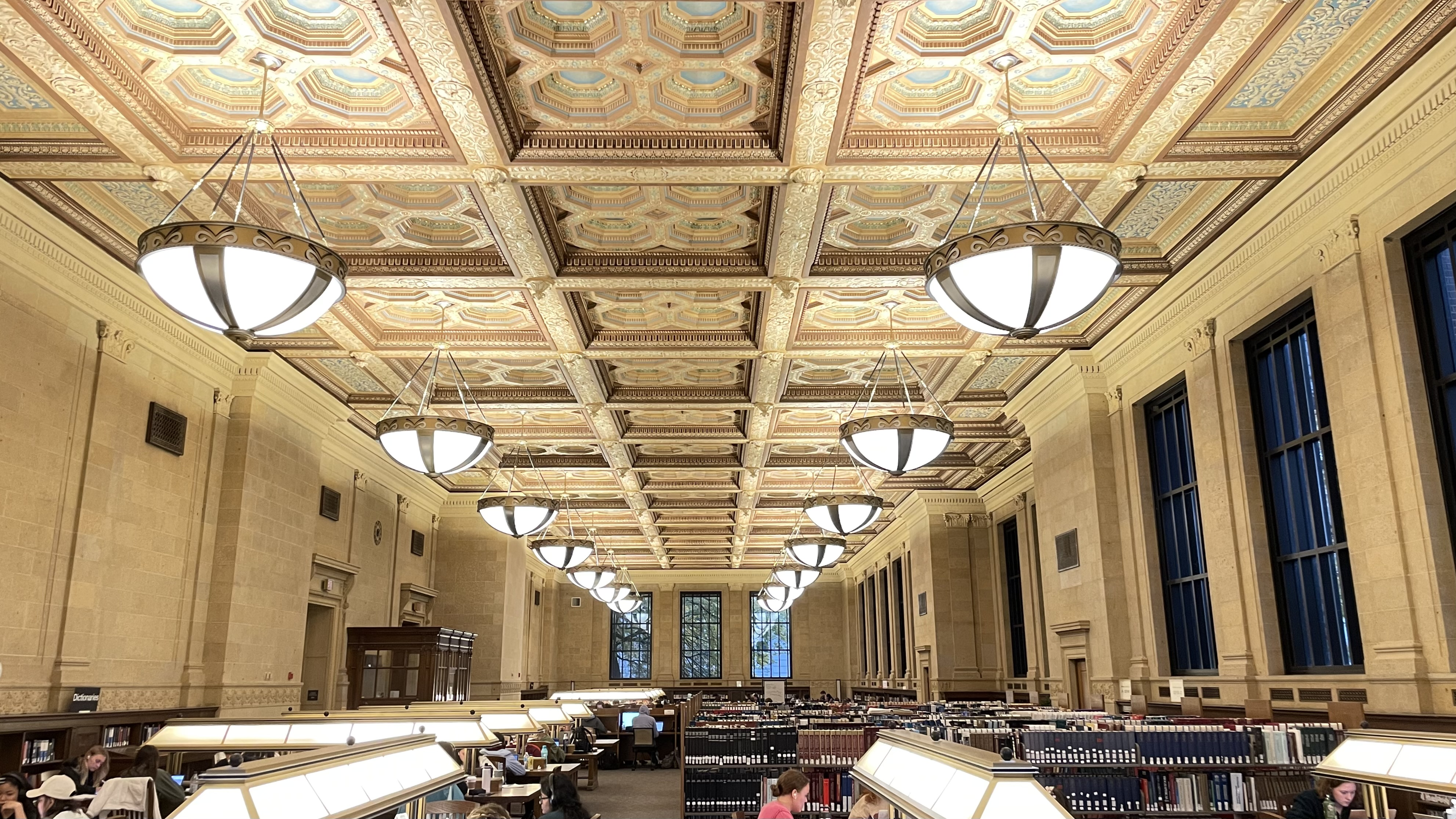
The Science and Engineering library

Walter Library was designed in the Beaux-Arts style of architecture by Minnesota State Architect Clarence H. Johnston Sr. Like the other buildings on Northrop Mall, Walter Library features a red brick facade with Bedford limestone trim and a colonnaded Ionic Order portico. Its interiors feature ornate columns and pilasters, marble staircases, vaulted ceilings, and gold leaf gilding. A common motif found within the library is that of an owl, which represents both wisdom and knowledge. There are an estimated 225 owl engravings located throughout the library, and a small restaurant in the building's basement is known as the Wise Owl Café. During the remodel, a sprinkler system was installed to bring the library up to modern building codes. In order to maintain the ceiling artwork, sprinkler heads and smoke detectors were strategically placed within the ceiling design to make them almost unnoticeable unless pointed out.

== Photo gallery ==
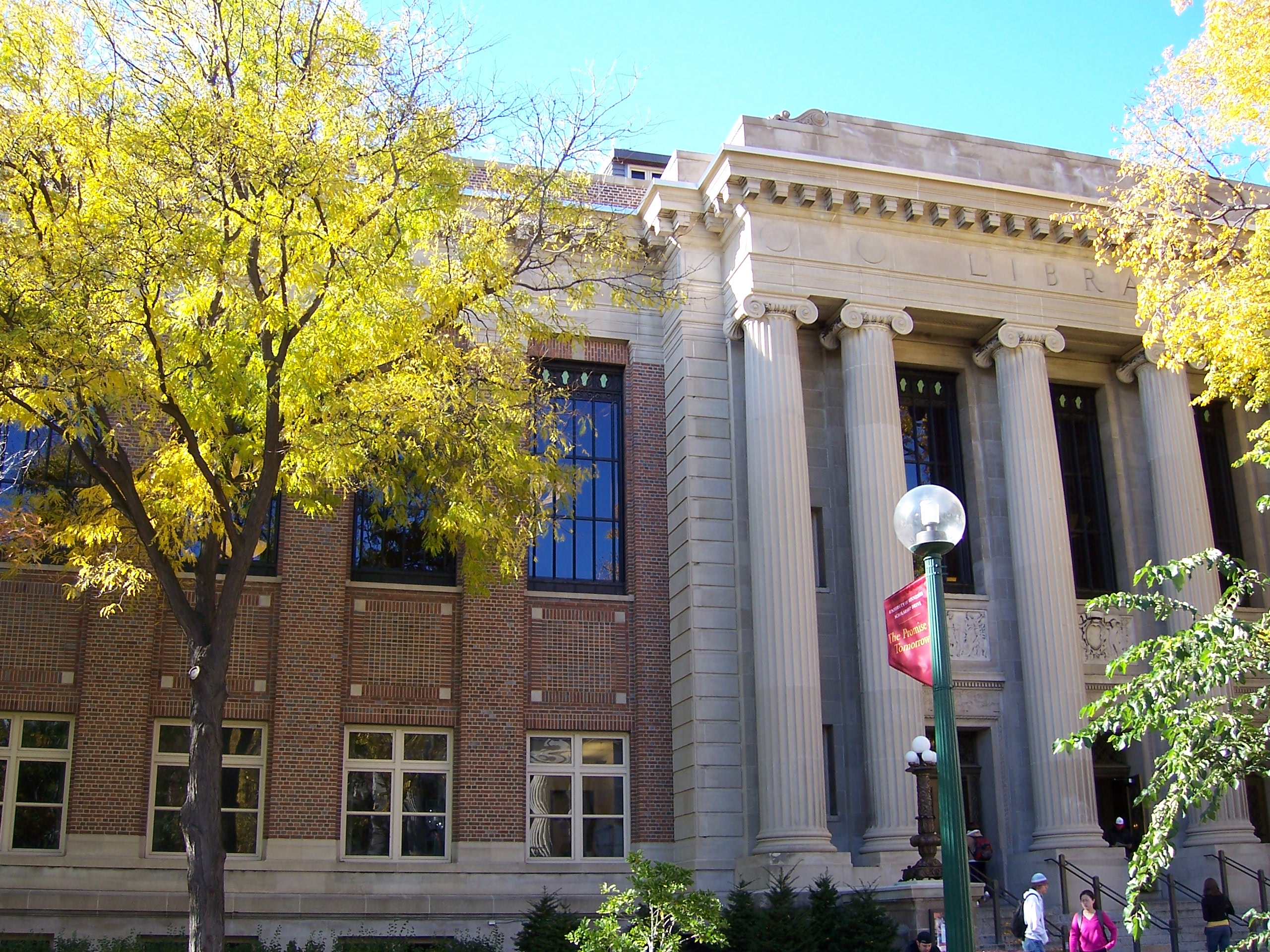
Walter Library's exterior, as seen from Northrop Mall

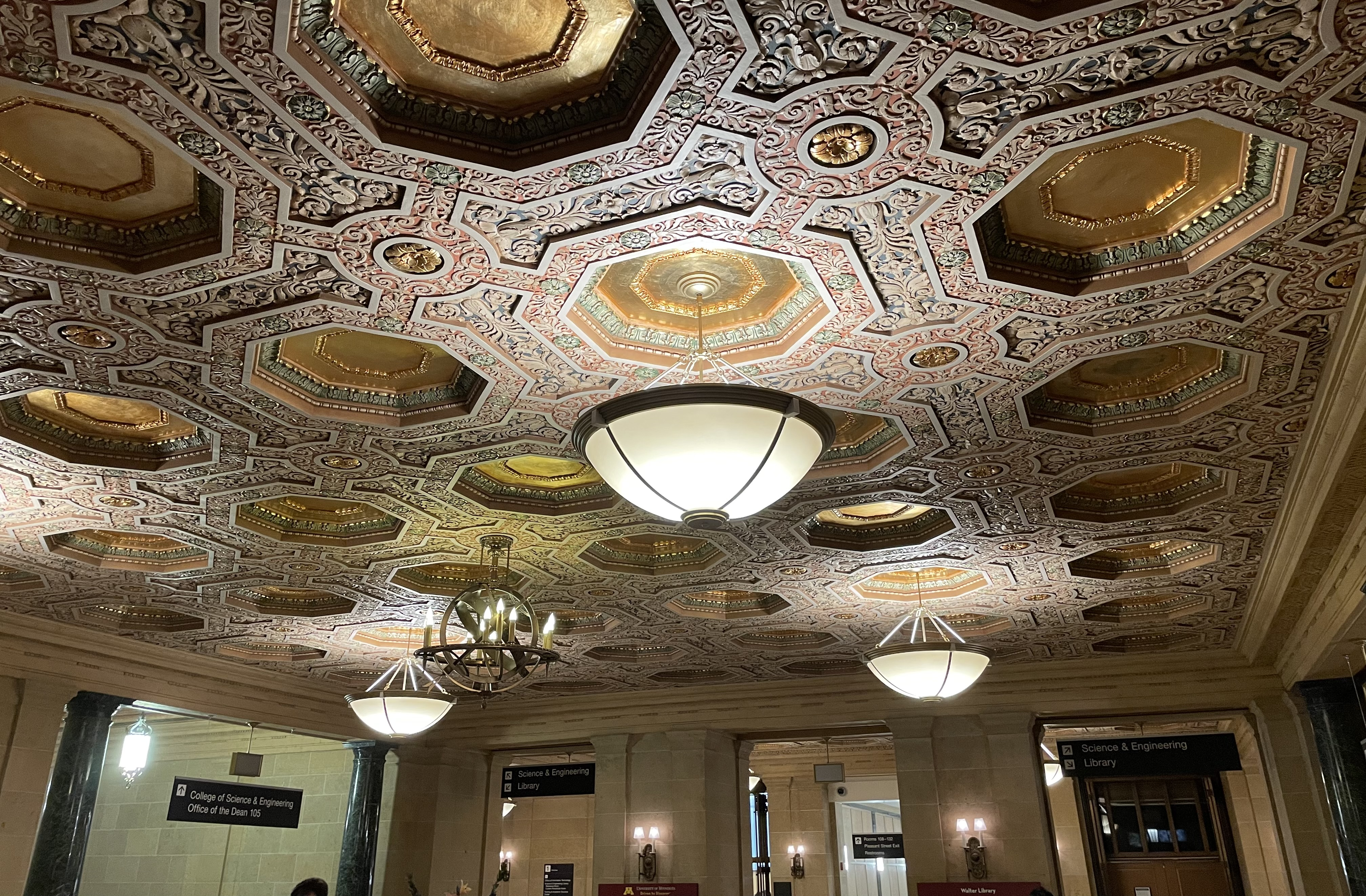
Walter Library's Northrop Mall entrance lobby

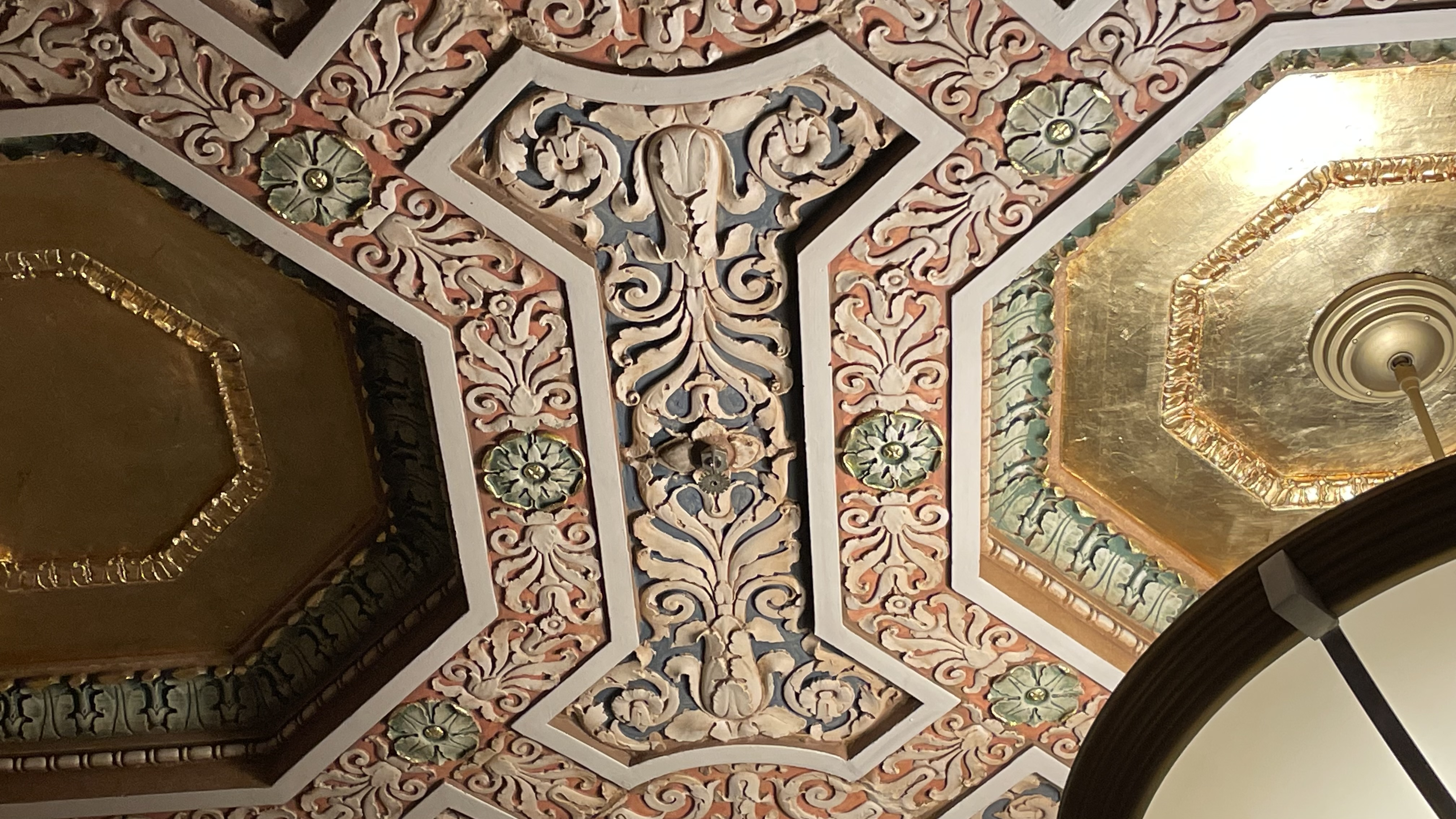
A hidden sprinkler head within the ceiling architecture of the lobby

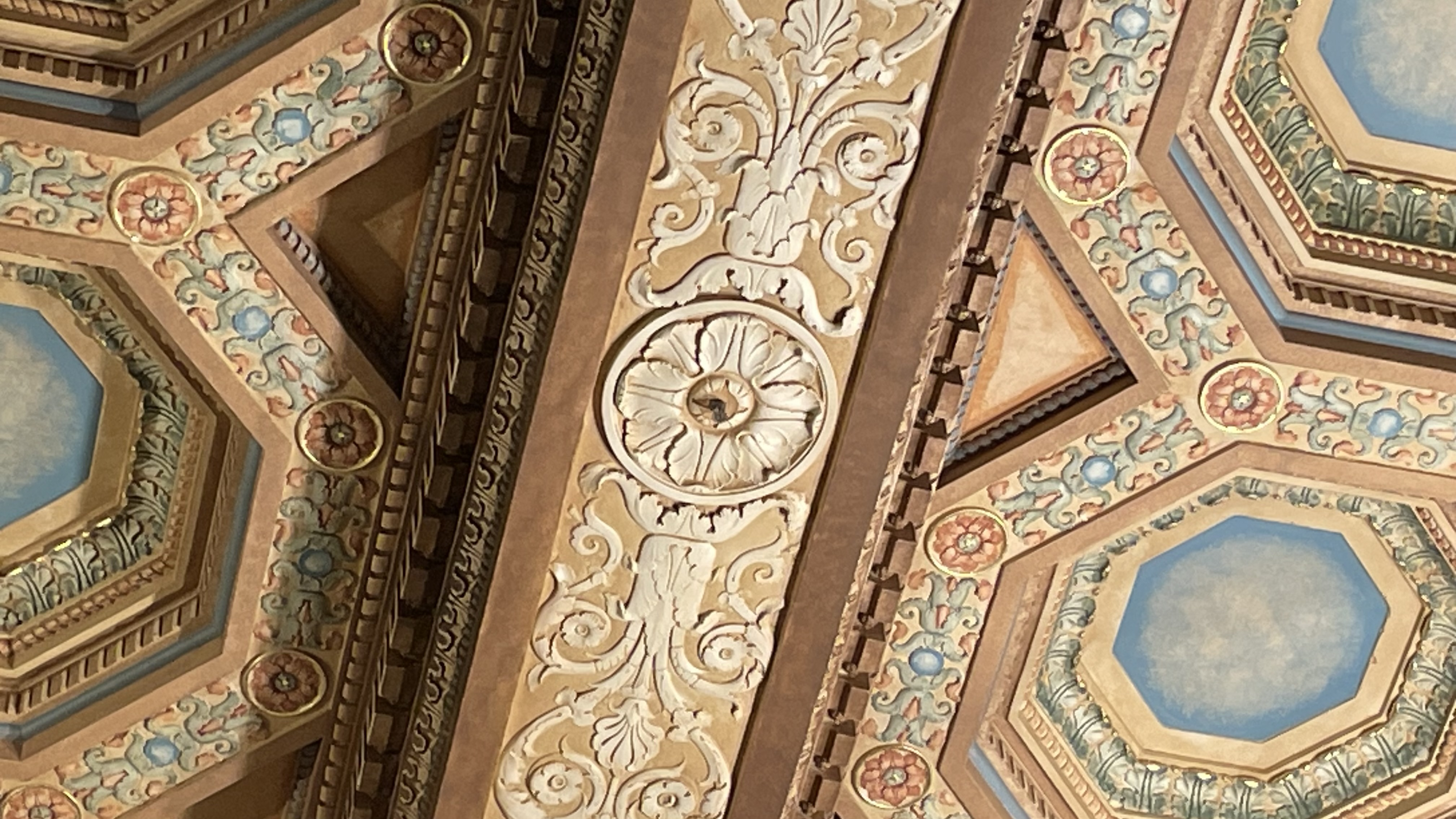
A hidden sprinkler head within the ceiling architecture of the Science and Engineering library

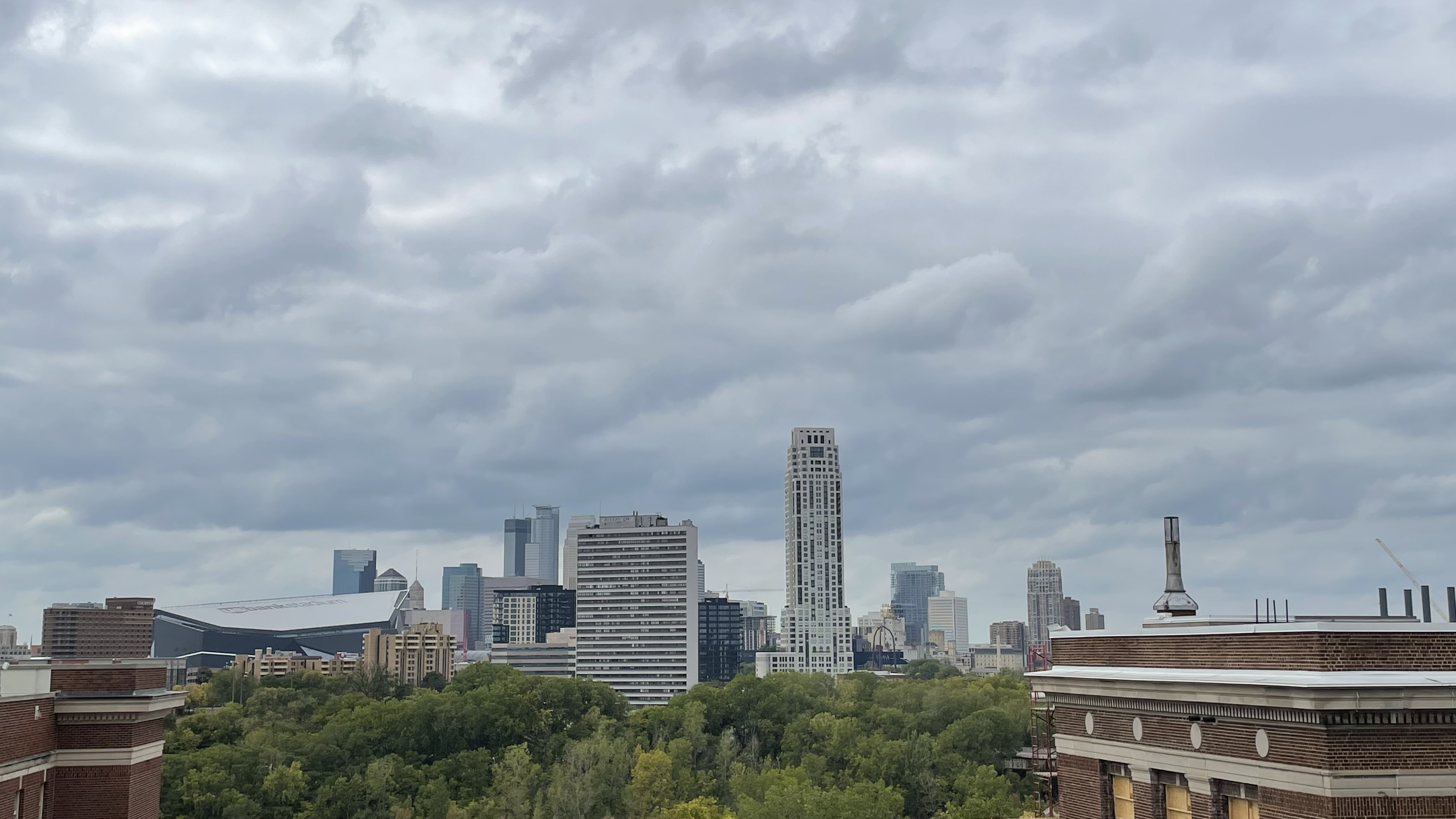
A view of the Minneapolis skyline, as seen from a balcony on the back of the library
