= University of Minnesota Supercomputing Institute =

US research laboratory

Coordinates: 44°58′31.0″N 93°14′10.7″W

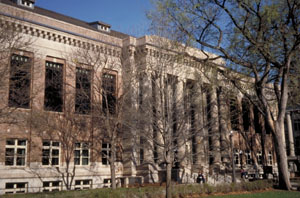
MSI Walter Library

The Minnesota Supercomputing Institute (MSI) in Minneapolis, Minnesota is a core research facility of the University of Minnesota that provides hardware and software resources, as well as technical user support, to faculty and researchers at the university and at other institutions of higher education in Minnesota. MSI is located in Walter Library, on the university's Twin Cities campus.

== History ==
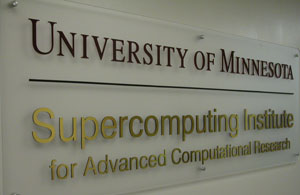
MSI Sign

In 1981, the University of Minnesota became the first U.S. university to acquire a supercomputer, a Cray-1. The Minnesota Supercomputing Institute was created in 1984 to provide high-performance computing resources to the University of Minnesota's research community. MSI currently has one HPC cluster, Agate, available for use.

MSI is part of Research Computing in the Research and Innovation Office. Research Computing is an umbrella organization that comprises the Minnesota Supercomputing Institute, U-Spatial, the Data Science Initiative, and the International Institute for Biosensing.

== Memberships ==
MSI is a member of the Coalition for Academic Scientific Computation, the Minnesota High Tech Association, the Great Lakes Consortium, and the Extreme Science and Engineering Discovery Environment (XSEDE).

== Supercomputing capabilities ==
=== HPC resources ===
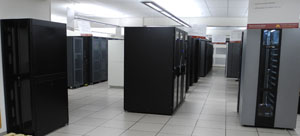
MSI Data center 1

Agate - HPE cluster with HPE and AMD CPU nodes and NVidia GPU nodes
