= Construction of the Minnesota State Capitol =

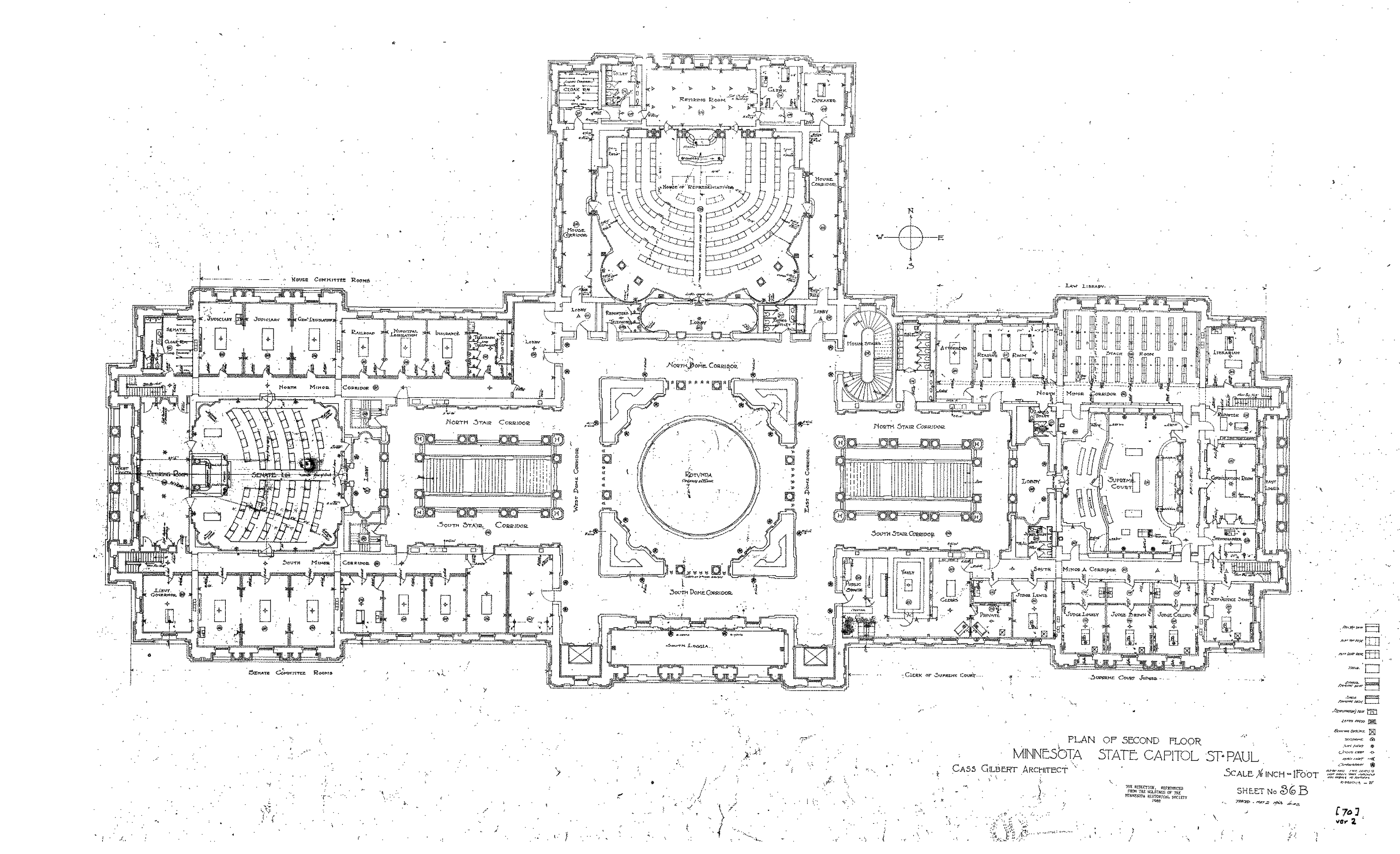
Second floor plan, ca. 1896

The current Minnesota State Capitol in Saint Paul was constructed from 1896 to 1905; shortly after the previous Capitol opened, it proved to be unsuitable due to overcrowding, a lack of adequate fireproofing, and poor ventilation. State officials began planning a grander, more-efficient Capitol. In 1893, Governor Knute Nelson appointed the seven-member Board of State Capitol Commissioners to oversee the construction of a new Capitol following the state legislature's recommendation. The commissioners selected local architect Cass Gilbert's design and chose a site at Wabasha Hill that was bounded by Park Avenue, University Avenue, Cedar and Wabasha Streets, and Central Avenue. Although it was the most expensive option, the chosen site was the largest of the four shortlisted sites, and the commission concluded it was the best location for the building.

Most of the work on the new building, the state's current seat of government, was done by hand. Horses and sometimes men supplied energy to hoist loads, and large stone blocks and iron girders were moved using steam-powered cranes and hoists. Shaping of the stone required the use of steam-powered drills, pneumatic chisels, channeling, and polishing machines. Much of the workforce were immigrants to the US. Six workers were killed in accidents between 1898 and 1903 as a result of unsafe working conditions.

Upon completion, the building drew praise from the architecture community, leading to requests for Gilbert to design Capitol buildings for other states including West Virginia and Arkansas, and other notable structures.

== Planning ==
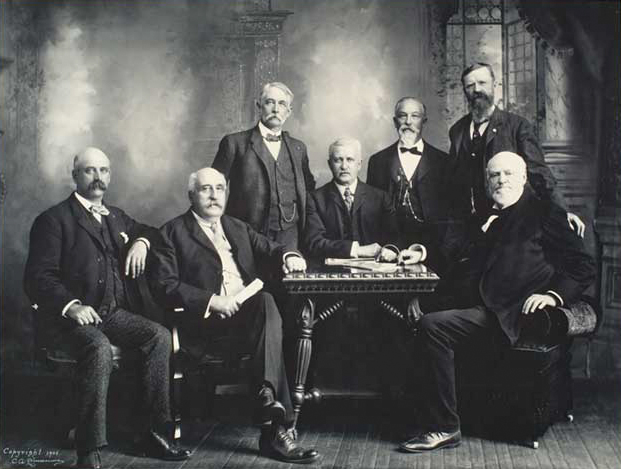
Minnesota State Capitol Board of Commissioners

In 1893, Governor Knute Nelson appointed the Board of State Capitol Commissioners to oversee the construction of a new Capitol following a recommendation by the state legislature, which had established a committee to investigate the need for a building and passed legislation procuring at least $2 million for the task. Despite the ongoing economic depression, it was considered a modest sum.

The commission consisted of several prominent residents of Minnesota, including banker Henry Wilson Lamberton, farmer James McHench, tool merchant Edgar Weaver, banker and agricultural entrepreneur George A. DuToit was a from Chaska. Manufacturer and banker John DaLaittre was from Minneapolis. The commission's vice president was Channing Seabury, who owned a grocery business in St. Paul. Seabury was the de facto head of the Board and led the Commission's lobbying for funds from the legislature. The Governor served as the honorary president but generally did not intervene in the commission's business.

=== Selecting the site ===
In its First Biennial Report issued January 1, 1895, the commission selected four possible sites for a Capitol building. One option was to use land at Exchange and Wabasha Streets, the site of the existing Capitol building, and combine it with a one-acre (0.40 ha) site bordering it to the north. The other three sites were located on hills around St. Paul; one was one block north of Central Park on what is now the Minnesota Judicial Center, another was located at Bass Hill at the head of Jackson Street site of the modern-day Mount Airy neighborhood. The commission considered and rejected these sites, which were all much smaller and more built-up than the selected site.

The site selected, which was known as Wabasha Hill, was bounded by Park Avenue, University Avenue, Cedar and Wabasha Streets, and Central Avenue. Although it was the costliest option, Wabasha Hill was also the largest of the four sites, leading the commission to conclude it was the best location for the building. Seventeen owners of the parcels of land making up the site asked $480,000 for its purchase but private negotiations with property owners persuaded most to accept less. Condemnation proceedings were used on one owner of two parcels to complete the transaction. The land for the Capitol was acquired for just over $285,000. The site's other advantages included frontage on University Avenue—at the time the most-important road between Minneapolis and St. Paul—and a lack of existing development in comparison to the other sites.

Images of Minnesota Capitol site

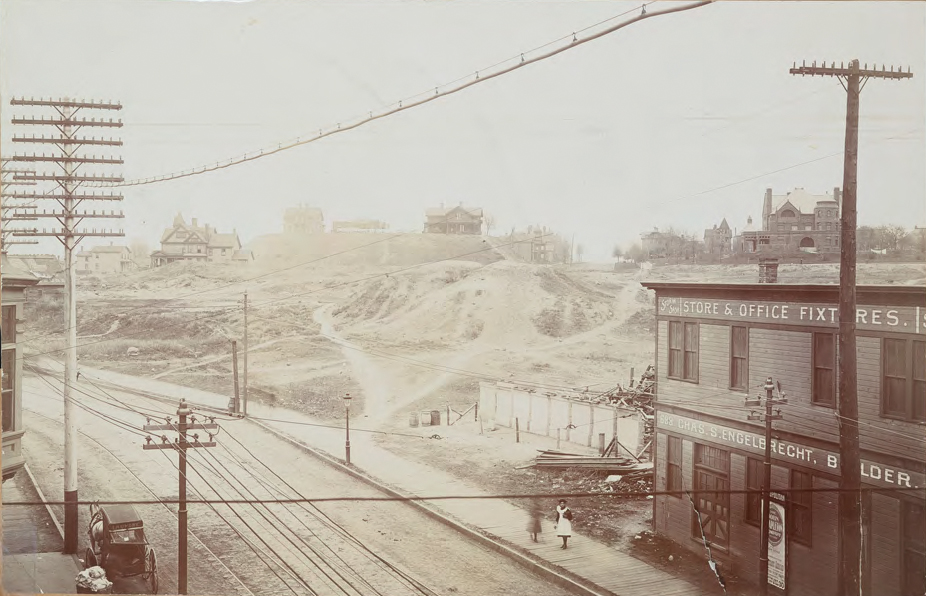
Minnesota Capitol site:
Looking North ca.1893

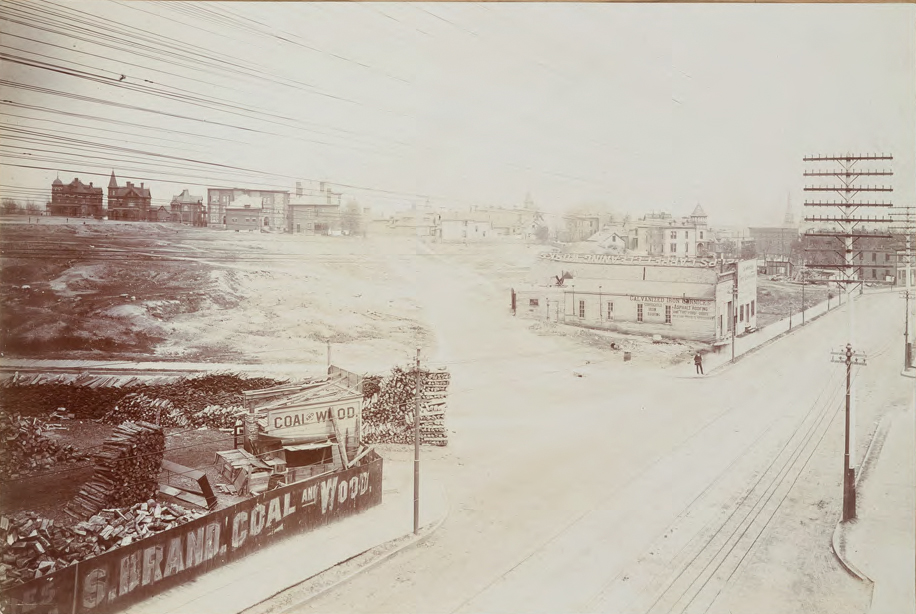
Minnesota Capitol site:
Looking East ca.1893

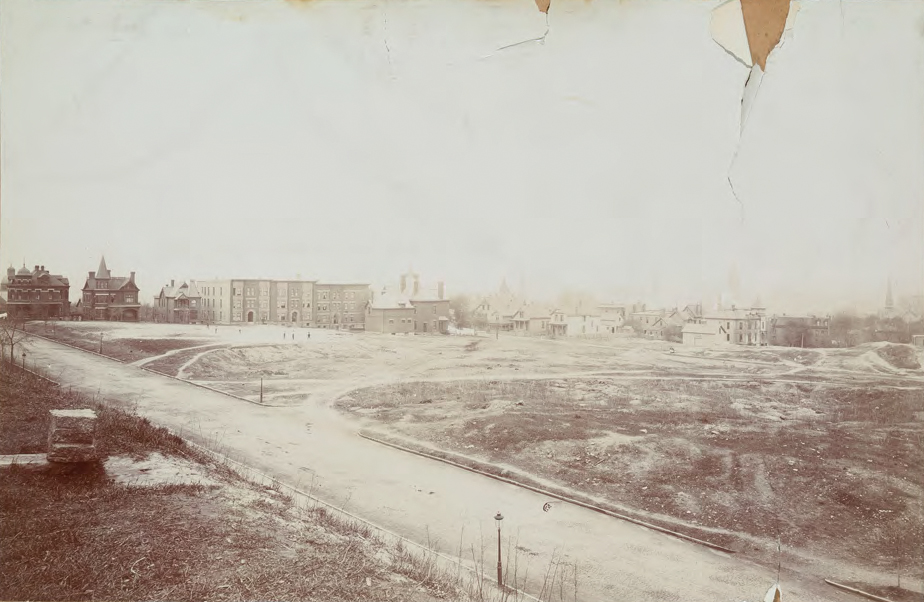
Minnesota Capitol site:
Looking South ca.1893

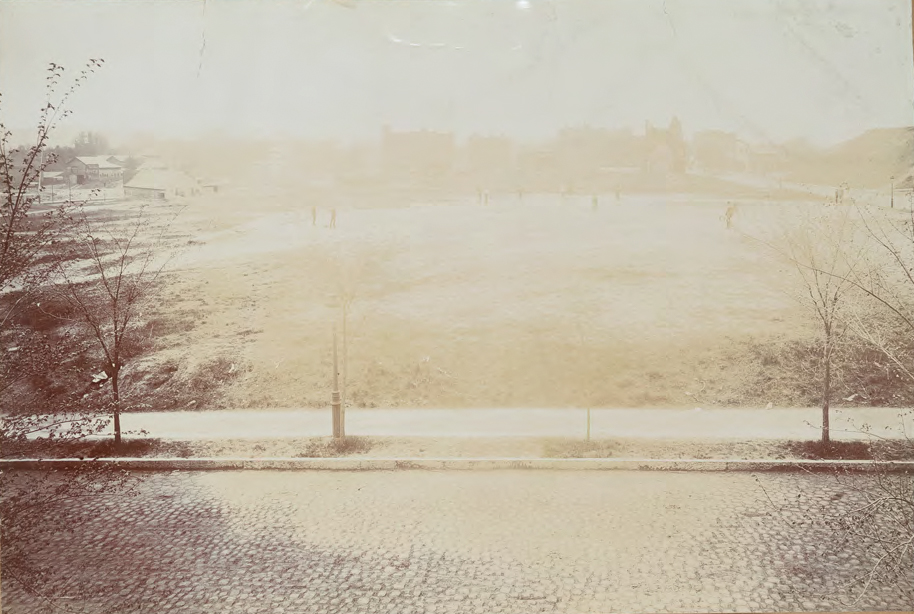
Minnesota Capitol site:
Looking West ca.1893

== Design process ==
=== Selecting an architect ===
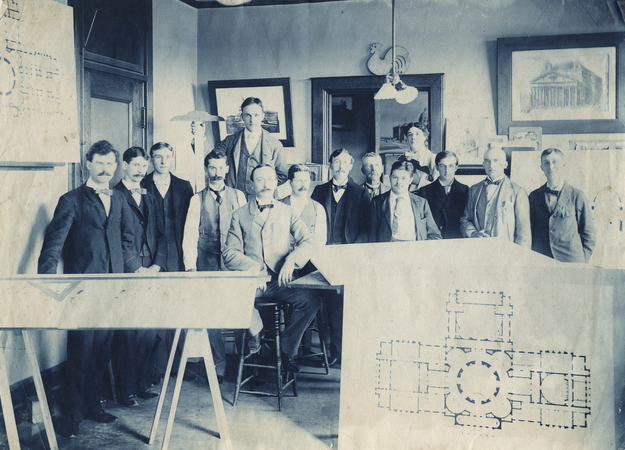
Cass Gilbert (on stool) and staff during construction of the Minnesota State Capitol

The commission advertised for designs in June 1894 and had received fifty-six proposals by the fall. Prominent architects M. Wheelwright of Boston and Henry Ives Cobb of Chicago advised the commission on selection. In their report to the commission on November 1, 1894, Wheelwright and Cobb chose five architects they believed were the best, even though none of the submissions had impressed the advising architects, and insisted none were deserving of quality construction materials, such as granite and other fine stone, and that limestone should be used instead. The five chosen architects were:

- First: Wendell & Humphreys of Denver, Colorado
- Second: J.A. Schweinfurth, of Boston, Massachusetts
- Third: George R. Mann, of St. Louis, Missouri
- Fourth: C. DeGersdorff, of Stockbridge, Massachusetts
- Fifth: Warren B. Dunnell, of Minneapolis, Minnesota.

All fifty-six submissions were eventually rejected.

Influenced by the criticisms of the submitting architects, the commission asked the legislature to change some of the conditions in the contracts. The burdensome design restrictions, insufficient funding, and the architect's limited control of the project would undermine the building. The legislature passed the recommended changes and on April 15, 1895, the commission announced another competition, for which it received forty-one submitted designs. Wheelwright helped the commission judge the entries and recommended five submissions for premiums; those of George R. Mann of St. Louis, Missouri; Wendell & Humphreys of Denver, Colorado; Bassford, Traphagen & Fitzpatrick of St. Paul and Duluth, Minnesota; Cass Gilbert of St. Paul, Minnesota; and Clarence H. Johnston of St. Paul, Minnesota. The commission began deliberations and on October 30, 1895. and made the following awards:

- First: Cass Gilbert of St. Paul, Minnesota
- Second: George Mann, St. Louis, Missouri
- Third: Bassford, Traphagen & Fitzpatrick, Duluth, Minnesota
- Fourth: Clarence H. Johnston, of St. Paul, Minnesota
- Fifth: Harry W. Jones of Minneapolis, Minnesota.

Cass Gilbert was awarded the Commission. Gilbert had not entered the first round, believing the compensation for the winner was too small.

The Denver architectural firm Wendell & Humphreys complained "politics" had influenced the awards. At its December 17 meeting, the commission decided "the letter of Mess. Wendell & Humphries [sic] be returned to them by the Vice President, with the statement that the Board considers their insinuation that local politics influenced the award of premiums, were uncalled for and that the Board does not care to file such communications". In its second report, the commission said it felt the need to notice these accusations because it asserted the selection was following the opinion of Wheelwright.

Images of Minnesota Capitol submitted designs

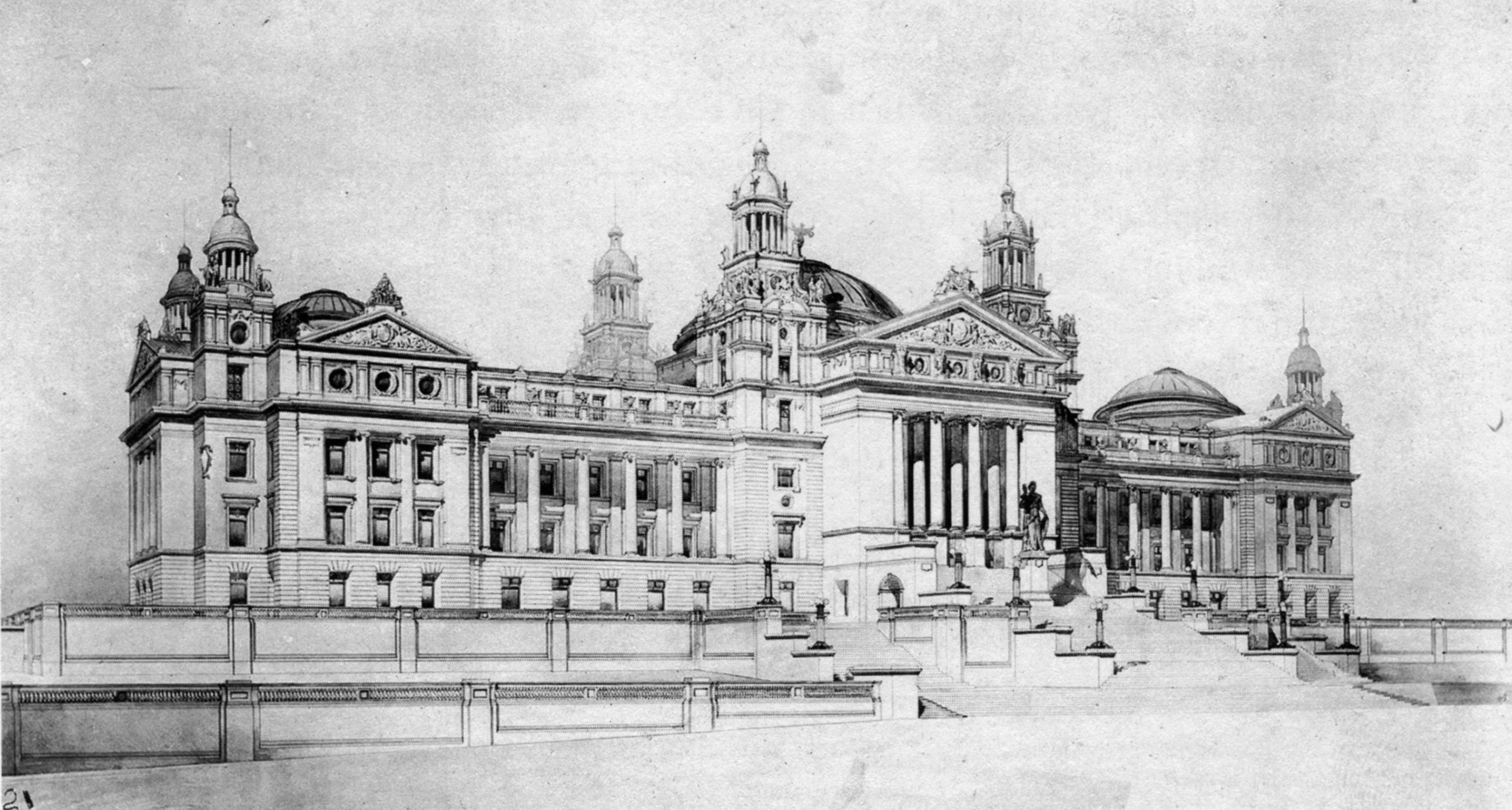
2nd place design for the Minnesota State Capitol by George R. Mann

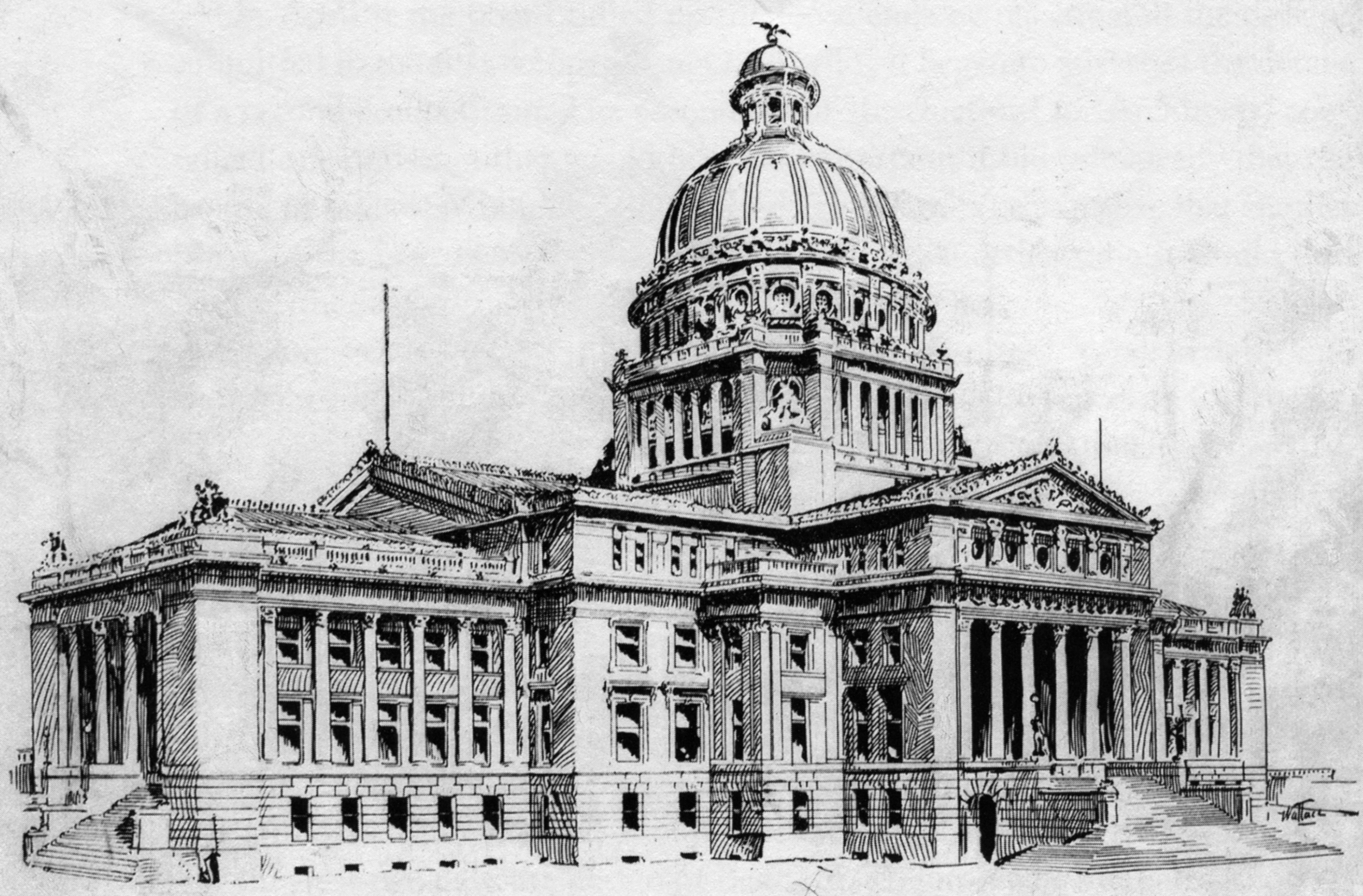
3rd place design for the Minnesota State Capitol by Bassford, Traphagen and Fitzpatrick

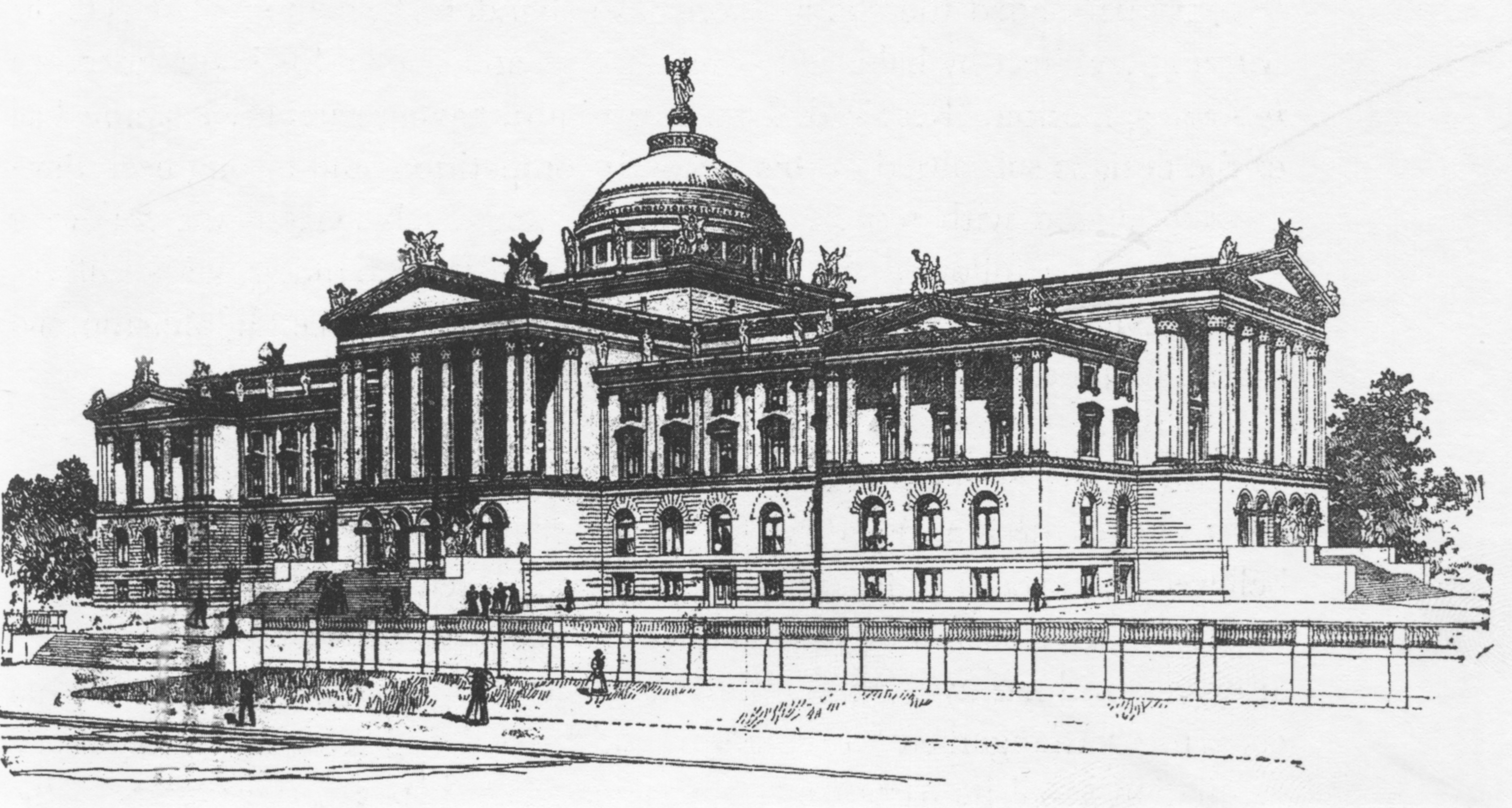
4th place design for the Minnesota State Capitol by Clarence H. Johnston

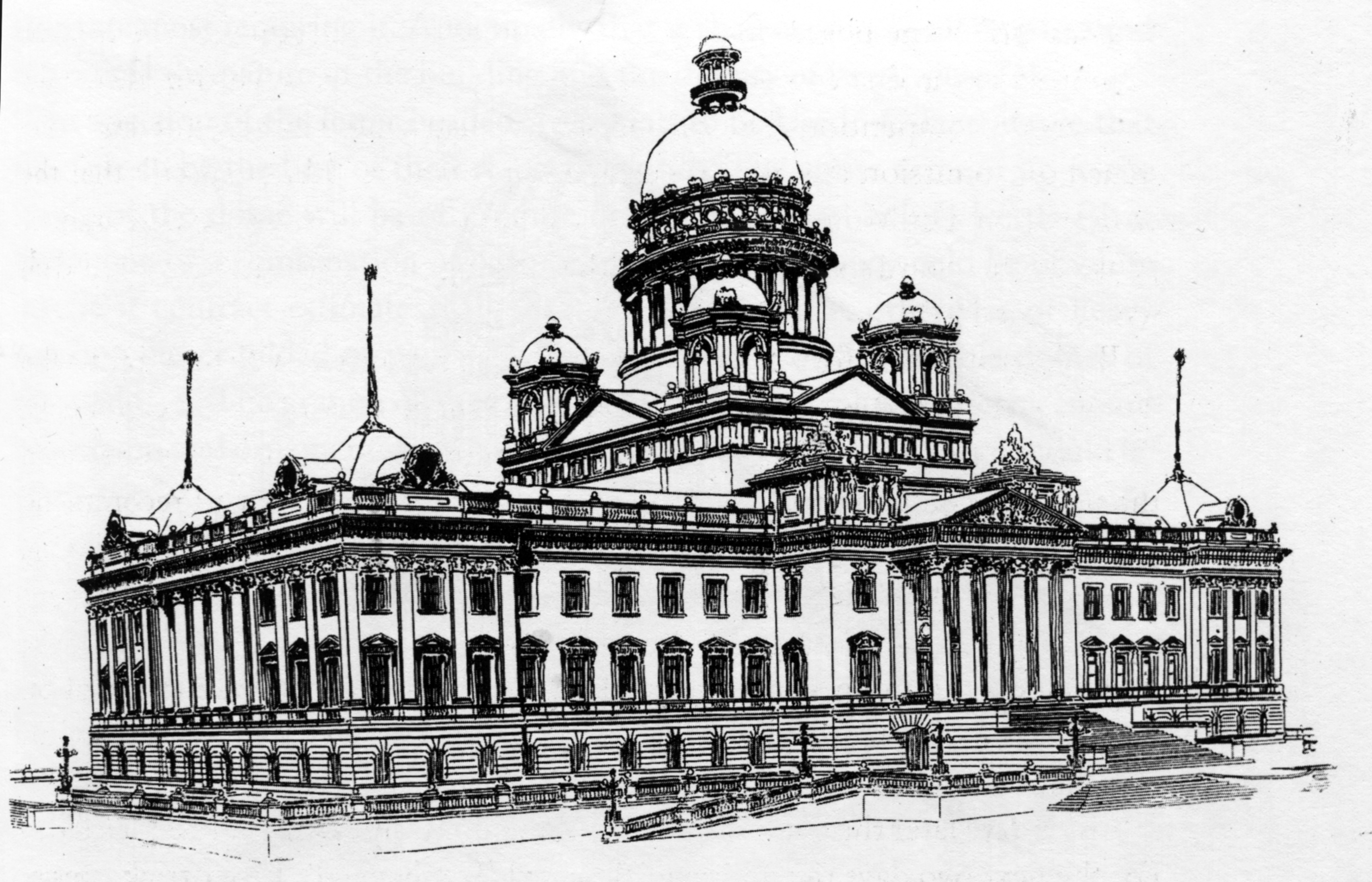
5th place design for the Minnesota State Capitol by Harry Wilde Jones

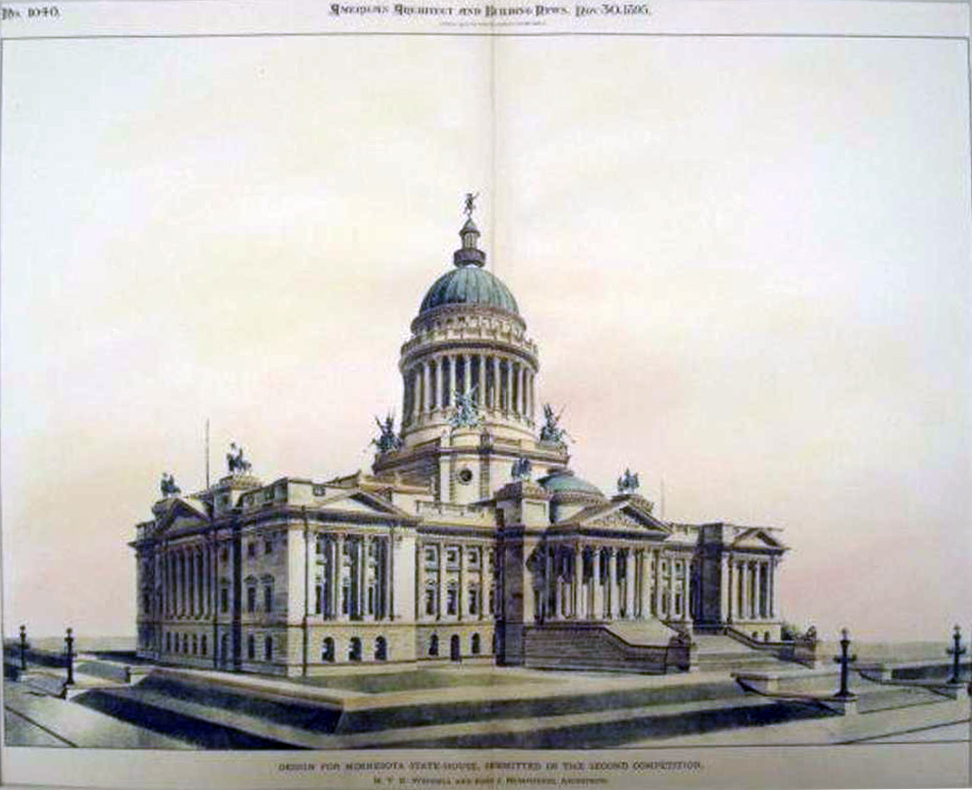
Minnesota State Capitol design by Wendell and Humphreys

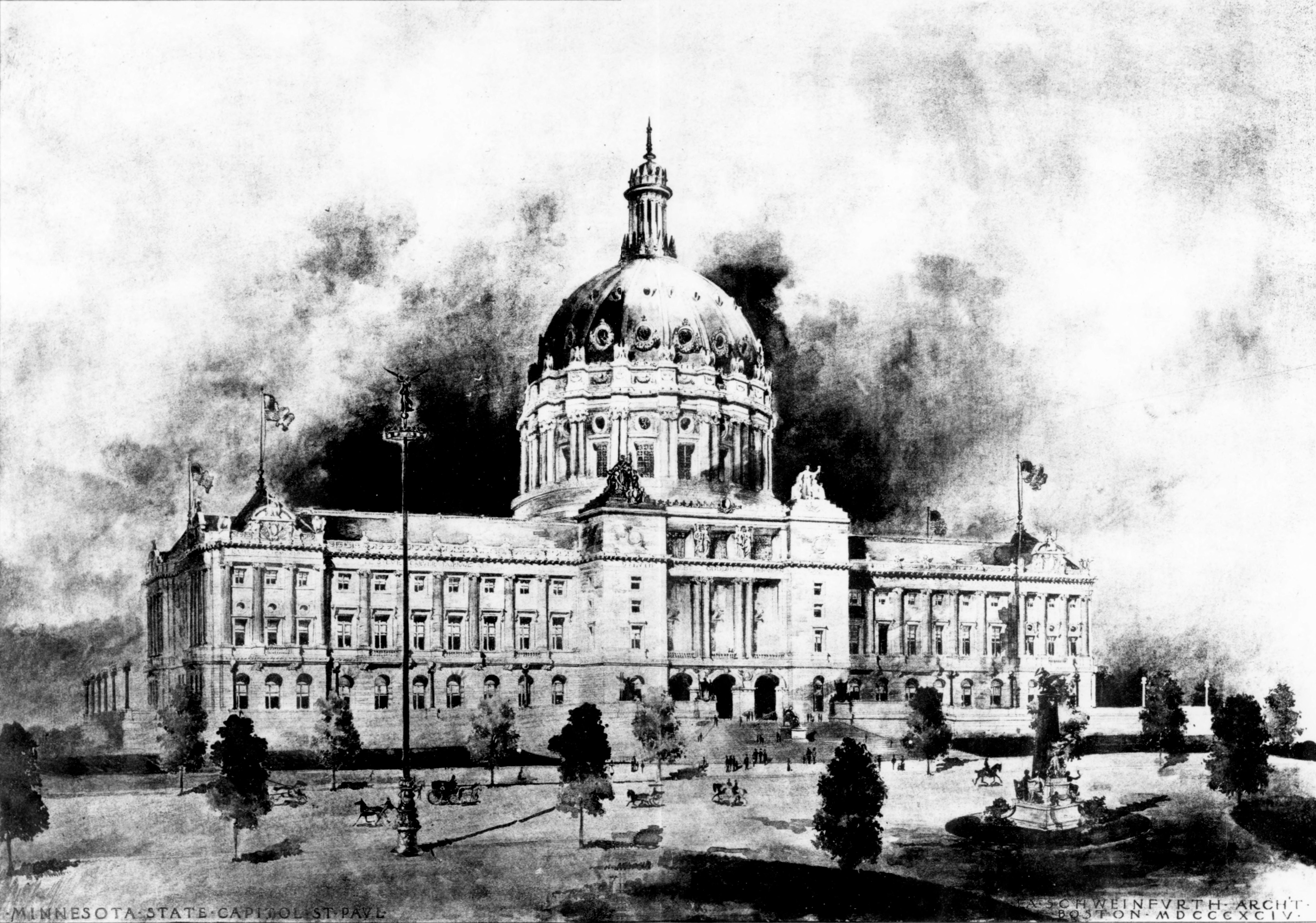
Other Submission for the Minnesota State Capitol by J. A. Schweinfurth

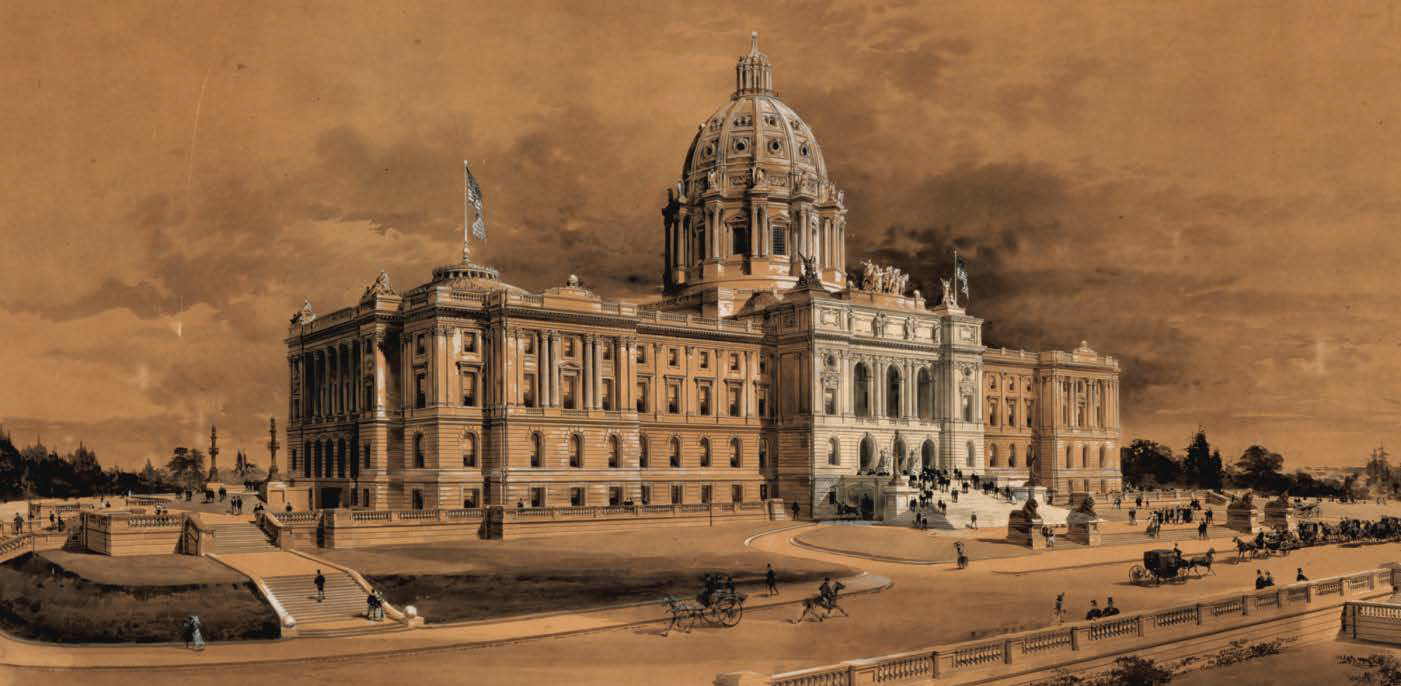
Winning design. Cass Gilbert's competition drawing for the Capitol

== Construction ==
=== Construction commences ===
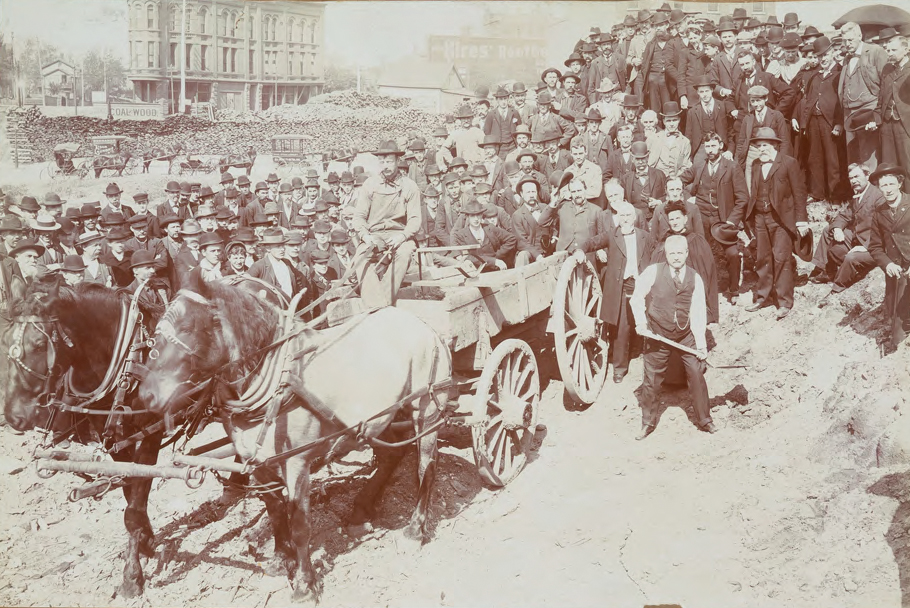
Breaking ground Ceremony Minnesota State Capitol 1896

Construction began on May 6, 1896; George J. Grant was selected for excavation and foundations. The first stone for the foundation was laid on June 23 of the same year. The foundation was quickly constructed, and completed by November 24. Steam-powered cranes and hoists were used to move large stone blocks and iron girders, and stone was shaped using steam-powered drills, pneumatic chisels, channeling, and polishing machines. Universal Construction of Chicago was selected to erect the steel structure of the ground floor in October of the same year. Construction was completed by January 1, 1897, and the second report was submitted to the commission the same day. Gilbert noted construction to that point had cost thirty percent below estimate, due to very low costs of steel at the time.

Governor Alexander Ramsey laid the cornerstone on July 27, 1898. The basement level, first-floor exterior walls, and major interior walls were all completed that year. The third commissioners' report, however, ends with another request for funds, noting with the current arrangement, there would be a shortfall, and there would not be any money for the interior finishes, priority having been given to the exterior enclosure of sufficient size to house the government, with finishes to be added later. Because fire had destroyed the first Capitol, mechanical systems were to take advantage of then-current technologies to reduce the risk of fire, including electric lighting, fireproof construction, and a steam power plant located safely in external buildings.

=== Budget crisis and impact on interior finishes ===
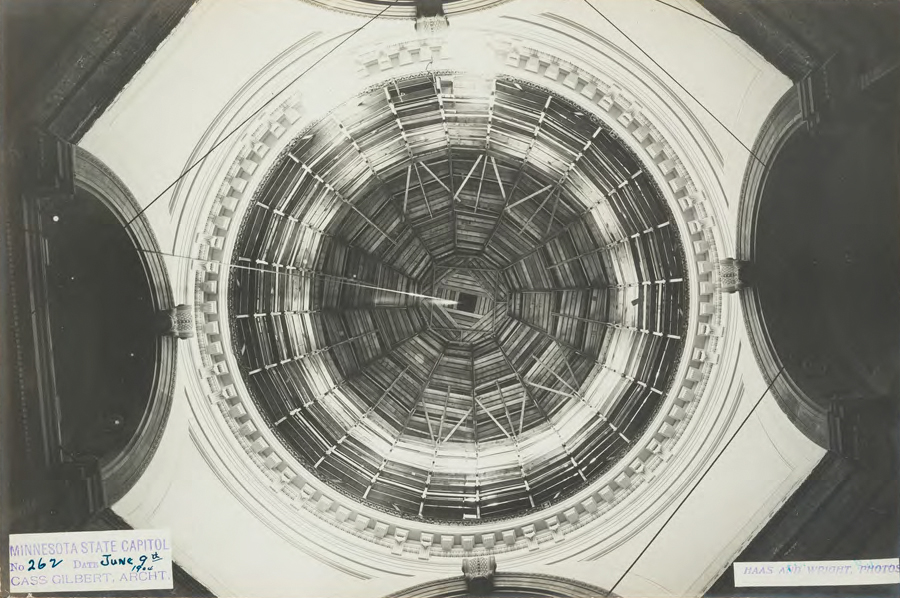
Minnesota State Capitol dome interior in an unfinished condition-1904

The commission's fourth report issued January 1, 1901, dealt with the interior finishes, a subject the previous report had hinted at. With the depression of 1893 now over, the report records a "strong advance" in costs since 1896, with supporting citation of the United States Treasury Secretary’s report to Congress that several public buildings then underway "cannot be completed within the authorized cost because of the rise in prices of building materials and other costs". The report then mentions several building projects where increased construction costs varied from 10% in a "very nearly completed" building to some buildings whose costs exceeded double the original estimate.

Using these and other detailed examples, the commission justified their strategy of completing the building's enclosure and deferring all costs non-essential to that purpose. The commission also estimated they could achieve with the present level of funding:

hardwood floors throughout [including public spaces] ... tin or other cheap final roofing ... plain plaster finish in vestibules ... fire proof vault doors in executive and administrative offices only ... cheapest possible floor construction and partitions and furrings [non fireproof] ... rotunda left empty, without gallery, columns or stone facings, and with a [plain] plaster finish ... [grand] staircase hall left empty, with plain plaster walls ... the senate, house of representatives, and supreme court room must be left with plain plastered walls ... boilers and ventilating plant to be located in the basement, and an iron smokestack run through flues which are designed for ventilation, and the use of tubular boilers, with a ventilating system which is inferior to the latest improvements ... a much cheaper material [than granite for the exterior stairs] which will inevitably have to be replaced in a few years.

The commission then requested an additional million dollars to adequately fit out the building's interior. With the additional money, the Capitol could be completed and ready to occupy by 1903. The commission needed to request an additional $1,500,000 to finish the interior of the building. They were confident this would be all that was needed because they already had many of the bids in hand. The legislature approved the funding, passing an act on April 3, 1903. The commission then proceeded to hasten the work, noting: "As the building has approached completion our labors have been more complicated and trying".

A number of smaller contracts that were drawn up late in the construction process were approved at this time:

- Diebold Safe and Lock Company for safe doors
- Van Dorn Iron Works for shelves
- Otis Elevator Company for elevators and "electric sidewalk lifts"
- Herter Brothers for furniture
- A Schuneman "and others" for carpets and draperies
- Mitchell Vance Co. for electric light fixtures
- Sterling Bronze company for electric light fixtures.
- Winslow Bros for mechanical grilles.

The major artwork contracts for the building were awarded to the artists John La Farge, D.C. French, Edward Simmons, E. H. Blashfield, E.E. Garnsey, F.D. Millett, Douglas Volk, H.O. Walker, and Kenyon Cox, "being among the most distinguished artists in the United States, to the total cost of $231,500.00".

=== Completion ===
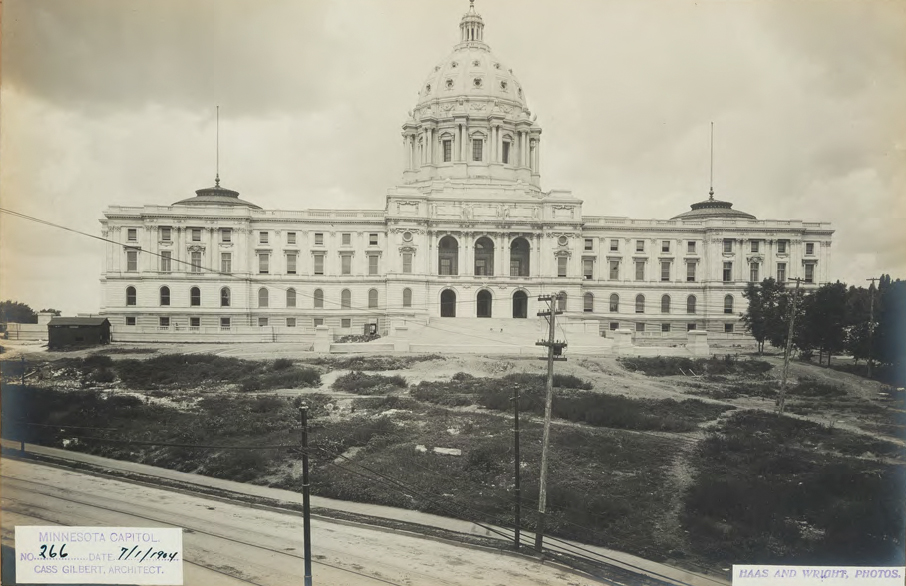
Minnesota State Capitol in 1904

With the issuance of its sixth report, the Board of State Capitol Commissioners declared as of January 1, 1905, the Capitol was ready to be occupied, though the interior art, and east and west entrance stairs remained incomplete, and the Quadriga was yet to be gilded. The final report of the commission, issued January 1, 1907, concluded the work of the Commissioners, who noted everything left unfinished at the time of the previous report had been completed.

The legislature authorized $60,000 a year for the building's maintenance, and the commission created a staff and budget they believed sufficient for the purpose. The commission requested the allotment of an additional $10,000 for contingencies and that a non-partisan body with full authority to make decisions about use of these funds should be set up.

Due to funding constraints, the commission had to omit fixtures they had hoped to complete, including:

- Candelabra to light entrance steps (later completed)
- Bronze lions (couchant) on four main pedestals
- One or more fountains in the grounds
- Two more pictures for the entrance to the Governor's reception room (later completed)
- Statues of "men prominent in the history of our State" for internal niches (later completed)
- Statuary on the cornice of the building.

=== Public outreach and input ===
Public display of the full-sized plaster models of sculptor Daniel Chester French's six "Virtues" to be completed for the exterior in marble and a scale model of the Capitol dome were created as part of a public outreach effort. Military veterans' groups approached the commission requesting the creation of monuments commemorating their sacrifices. The commission informed the legislature they had no funds for the creation of war memorials, and suggested instead the main approach to the Capitol be made into a "memorial approach" that would meet their requirements for commemoration and would "be a pleasing departure from the stereotyped monument", which often took the form of statues on top of pillars.

== Workers ==
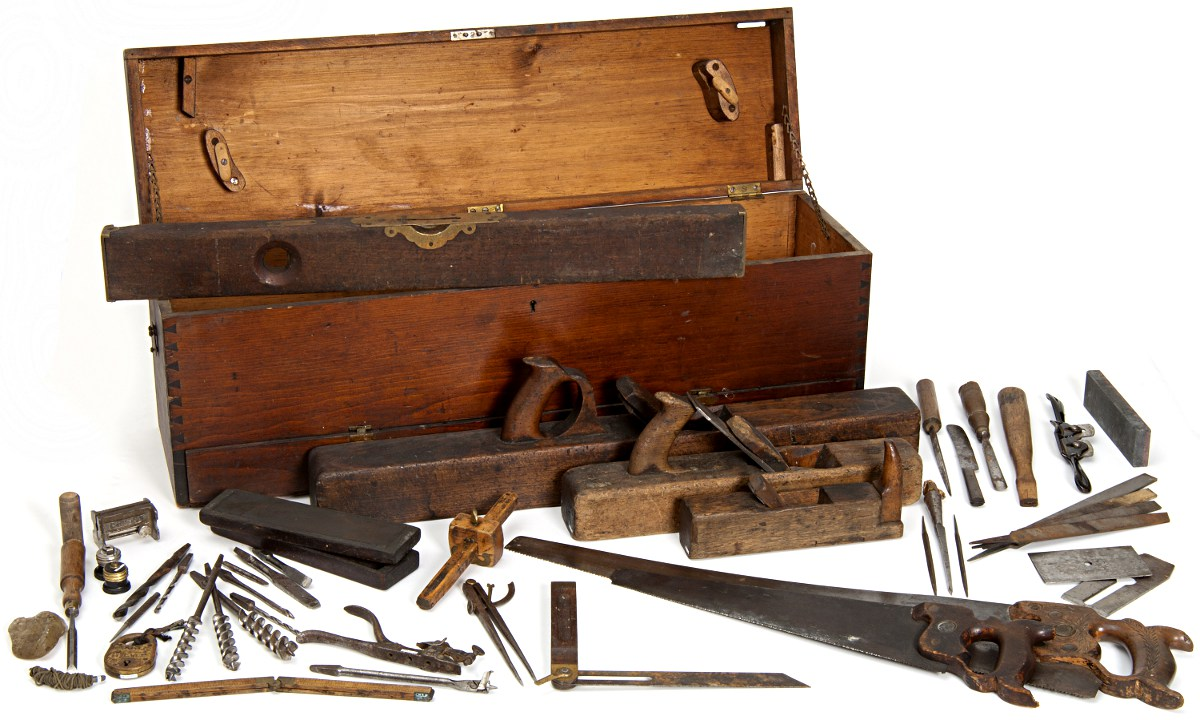
Carpenter's tools used by William Martin Knudsen in the building of the State Capitol

Since construction began on the Minnesota Capitol in 1896, hundreds of workers helped complete the statehouse in 1907. While names of the Capitol Commissioners, and architect Cass Gilbert and his associates were cast on a bronze plate, the building's craftsmanship was done by workers who have largely been forgotten. This mainly-immigrant workforce used hand tools with skills generally not practiced by 21st-century construction workers. A labor strike in January 1902 interrupted work on the Capitol. Stonemasons struck for ten weeks to protest the presence of a non-union blacksmith. The commission said soliciting and then rejecting all bids from contractors may create for itself a reputation that would lead to fewer applicants. For this reason, the commission signed several contracts that were somewhat higher than estimated, including those for metal-furring and lathing, plastering, and ornamental ironwork.

The rise in prices during the construction was called unprecedented. The Capitol in Iowa, which the commissioners frequently used as a point of comparison, was completed twenty years previously, with an average wage for skilled labor of $2.50 to $3 for a ten-hour work-day. The 1901 prices for the same worker for an eight-hour day were now $3.60 to $5. The eight-hour workday was not officially enacted until 1937. This can be viewed as an indication of the power of union labor in Minnesota at the time.

=== Craftspeople and other construction workers ===
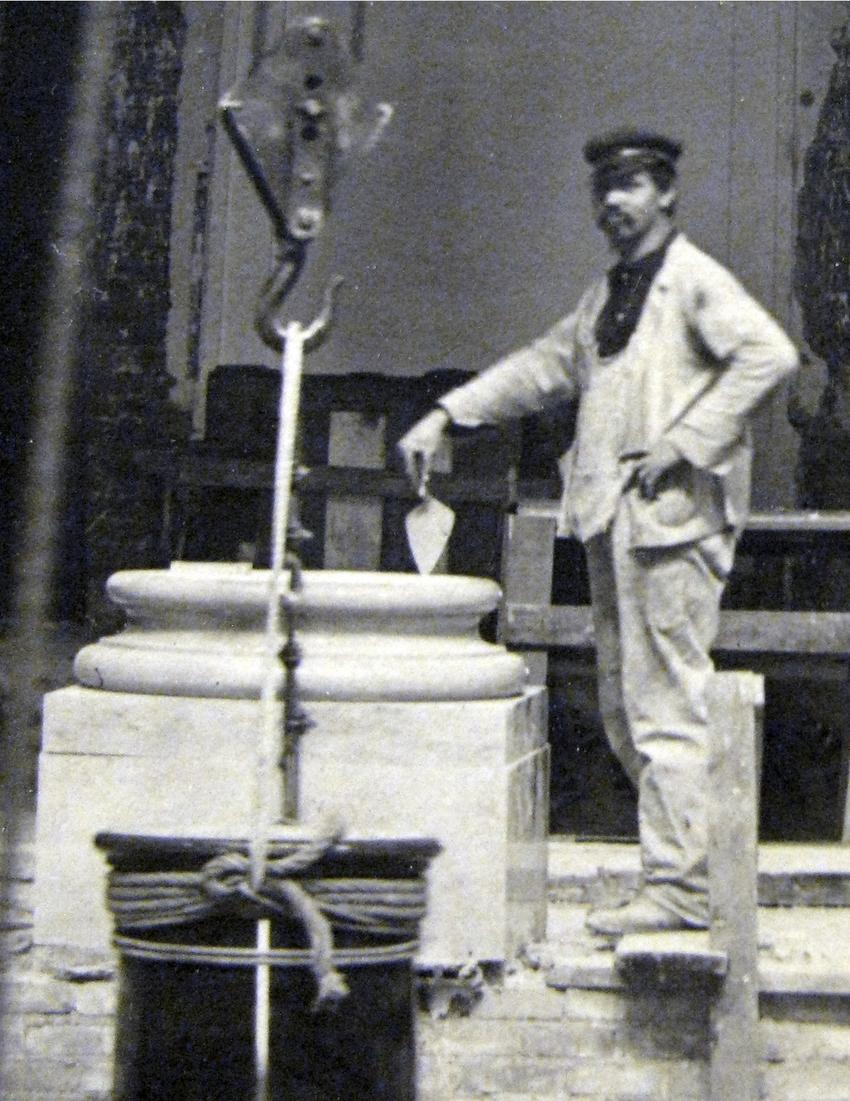
Stonemason at the Capitol, likely Nils Nelson

Nils Nilsson, born in Sweden in 1864, worked for Butler-Ryan Co. as a stone mason. As their chief stone mason, Nelson and his crew set 75% of all the stone in the Capitol building. As the building neared completion, the newspaper Pioneer Press published an article on Nelson that called him the "Man Who Actually Built Capitol". In April 1902, Nelson slipped on some gravel while he was setting the marble at the top of the dome. As he was sliding down the dome, he caught himself on one of the dormers and narrowly avoided falling to his death.

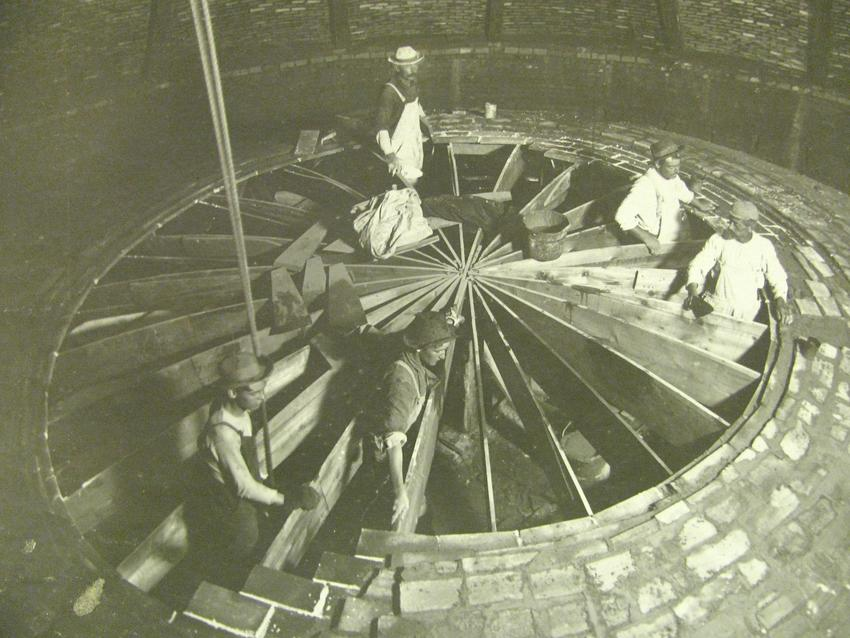
Guastavino tile layers construct the inner layer of the Capitol dome

Raphael Guastavino III designed the fireproof tiles used in the Capitol's vaulted ceilings and supervised the tile work. His family's Guastavino tile-arch building technique was developed in Spain and introduced to the United States in 1885 by his father, architect and builder Rafael Guastavino; this technique was used in the Capitol and in buildings all over the country including notable New York City buildings such as Great Hall in the Main Building at Ellis Island, Carnegie Hall, Grand Central Station, and Grant's Tomb.

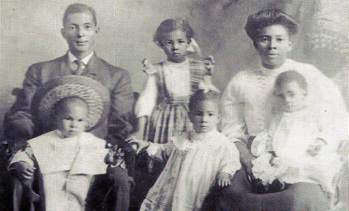
Casiville Bullard Family

Casiville Bullard was a stonemason and bricklayer. He was sought after for his skills since it was rare to find a laborer proficient at both brick and stonework. Born in Tennessee in 1871 and the son of formerly enslaved persons, he was the eldest in a family of seven children. As a child, he was taught bricklaying and masonry by an uncle, becoming skilled at laying brick, marble, and granite. He moved to St. Paul in the late 19th century to work on the Capitol building. Bullard was a member of the Bricklayers Local #1, which was unusual for an African American of his time. Like Bullard, work on the State Capitol attracted African American stonecutters, stonemasons, bricklayers, and other skilled laborers to St. Paul. Around twenty skilled Capitol craftsmen were African American.

William Knudsen was born in Norway in 1859 and immigrated to America in 1882. Knudsen worked as a carpenter; his toolbox and tools are in the collection of Minnesota Historical Society. While working on the Capitol, it is likely he was a subcontractor for Butler-Ryan Co., the contractors for the Capitol.

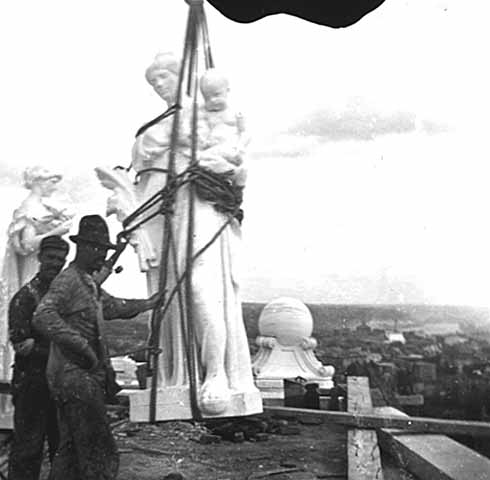
The Virtue statue "Bounty" is being lowered in place on the Capitol. The man with the pipe is likely Nils Nelson

Frederick Purdy, a Journeymen Stonecutters' Union member, was one of two partners of the Chicago-based firm Purdy and Hutcheson, which sub-contracted carving of ornamental stone at the Capitol. Born in England in 1855, Purdy immigrated to the US in 1886. His firm was contracted to carve six sculptures based on the models of the "Virtues" created by Daniel Chester French that were placed above the Capitol's main entrance. Stonecutters William Hutcheson and Albert Corwin were among the stonecutters who rendered the "Virtues" in marble. The statues in place today are locally carved replicas made in 1975–1979.

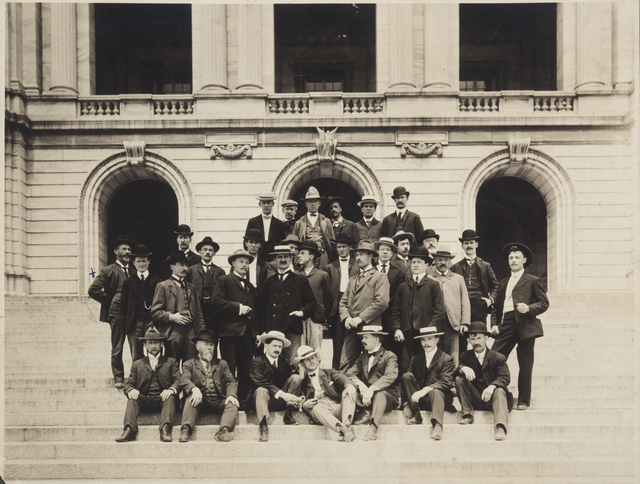
Decorative artists of the Minnesota State Capitol. Person 2nd from left, front row likely Elmer Garnsey.

New-Yorker Elmer Garnsey went to Minnesota in mid 1903 to work as the chief decorator for the Capitol interior, the same position he had at the Library of Congress. As the director of decoration, Garnsey's role was to determine color schemes, designs and motifs for the spaces decorated with artwork. Garnsey coordinated the work of painters and decorators, and also designed paintings for the stairway halls and legislative chambers. Garnsey belonged to the Mural Painters Society.

The decorators and painters who worked on the Capitol typically would have belonged to professional organizations such as the Brotherhood of Painters, Decorators and Paperhangers of America or the Mural Painters Society; these organizations were attempts to educate craftsman and unite them as a group.

Very few women were employed on the building's construction. US census records and entries in payroll offer some of the few details that can be found. Some women worked in the contractors’ office, and as drapery seamstresses. A New York woman was a co-owner of a company that manufactured furniture for the building.

Two mother-and-daughter families—Josephine and Jennie Sheeran, and Sarah and Sadie Constant—worked on the Capitol near the end of construction in 1905 as cleaners. Sarah Constant moved from Saint Louis, Missouri, with her spouse Paul but was widowed, leaving her with a son Paul and her daughter Sadie. Payroll records list Constant as a cleaner. Women earned $1.50 a day for a 9- or 10-hour day – .25 cents a day less than men doing janitorial or cleaning work. Josephine Sheeran and her daughter Jennie lived nearby at a Catholic home for "indigent women and orphaned girls".

=== Deaths and injuries ===
Six workers died during the building of the Minnesota State Capitol as a result of unsafe working conditions. The six workers received recognition during Workers' Memorial Day ceremonies in 2011 and 2012. Later, a plaque was installed in the Capitol in 2017 due to the efforts of a group of Owatonna, Minnesota, middle-school students who successfully lobbied for a bill to authorize the memorial after learning about the deaths of the workers.

On May 5, 1898, Felix Arthur, aged 25, was ensnared in the flywheel of the stone-polishing machine he was working on and was nearly cut in half. He died the next morning at Saint Joseph's Hospital in St. Paul, becoming the first worker to die while working on the Capitol.

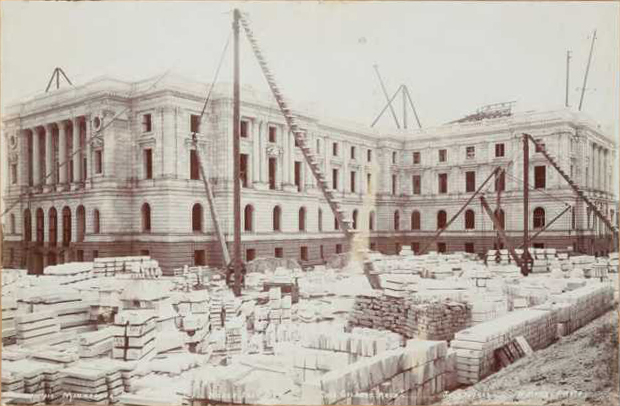
Hoist made of logs with climbing slats, like the one from which worker John Biersack fell and died.

All other statehouse deaths were caused by falls. In October 1898, John Biersack, a 36-year-old from Wisconsin, fell off a hoist and died as a result. An unlikely accident killed twenty-year-old Swedish immigrant Albert Swanson when a passing wagon drove over rope used to hoist materials and scaffolding on which the men were standing, causing Swanson and another worker Frank Thiery to fall forty feet (12 m). Swanson collided with scaffolding, killing him before he hit the ground. Thiery landed on a pile of sand and broke his leg but was able to go home from the hospital that night.

Another Swedish immigrant, twenty-year-old stonemason Alfred Magnuson, was the nephew of Capitol master stonemason Nils Nelson. On June 25, 1900, Magnuson fell thirty feet (9.1 m)and died in St. Joseph's Hospital four days later. German immigrant Florian Zauner was a laborer on the Capitol when he fell seventy feet (21 m) and died immediately on August 3, 1900. The last person to die while working on the Capitol was eighteen-year-old John Corrigan on June 25, 1903, when he fell thirty-two feet (9.8 m) feet to his death in the unfinished House Chamber. After less than two weeks on the job, Corrigan lost his balance while carrying a heavily loaded wheelbarrow across a narrow, unguarded gangway.

On June 27, 1903, the Minneapolis Journal headline read: "Deaths Due To Neglect". The public reaction to Corrigan's death may have caused a change in working conditions. In 1917, stonemason Erik Isaacson fell from the scaffolding, breaking his back. His 15-year-old daughter left school to work because Isaacson could no longer work; no accident insurance was in place at the Capitol construction site. Workers and families were expected to cover the costs of workplace injuries and deaths; employers and the government had little responsibility for accidents and their results.

== Gallery ==
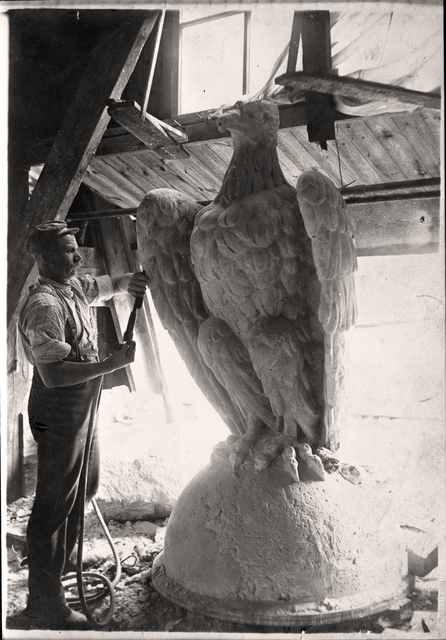
Man working on eagle for the dome.

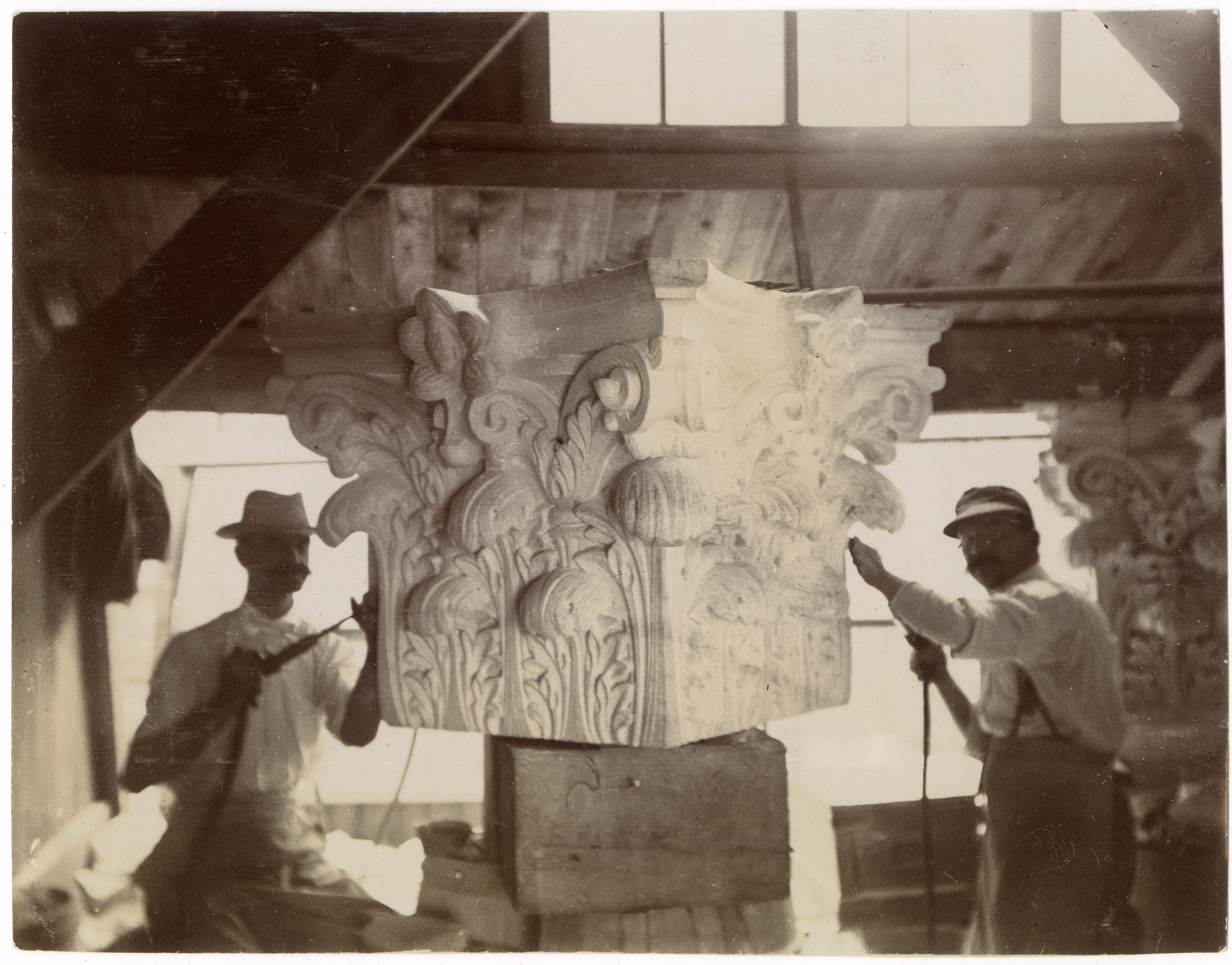
Stone carvers Minnesota State Capitol

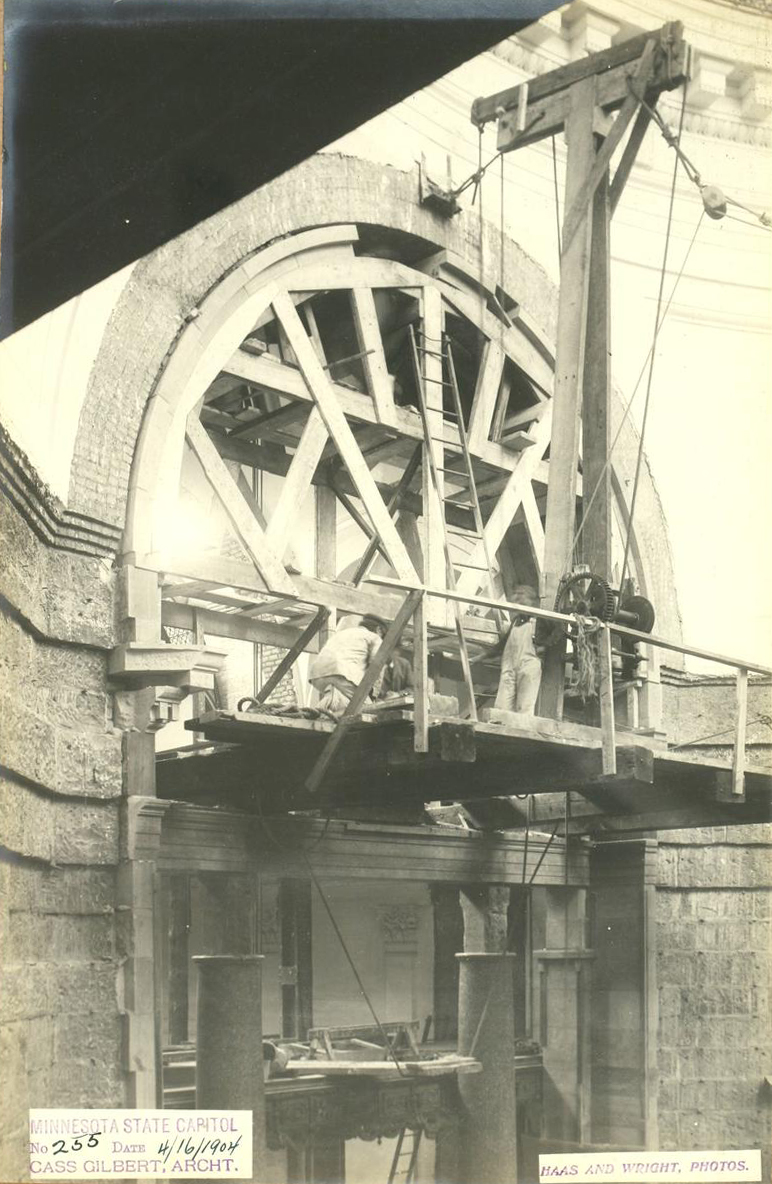
Arch support inside the rotunda, 1904.

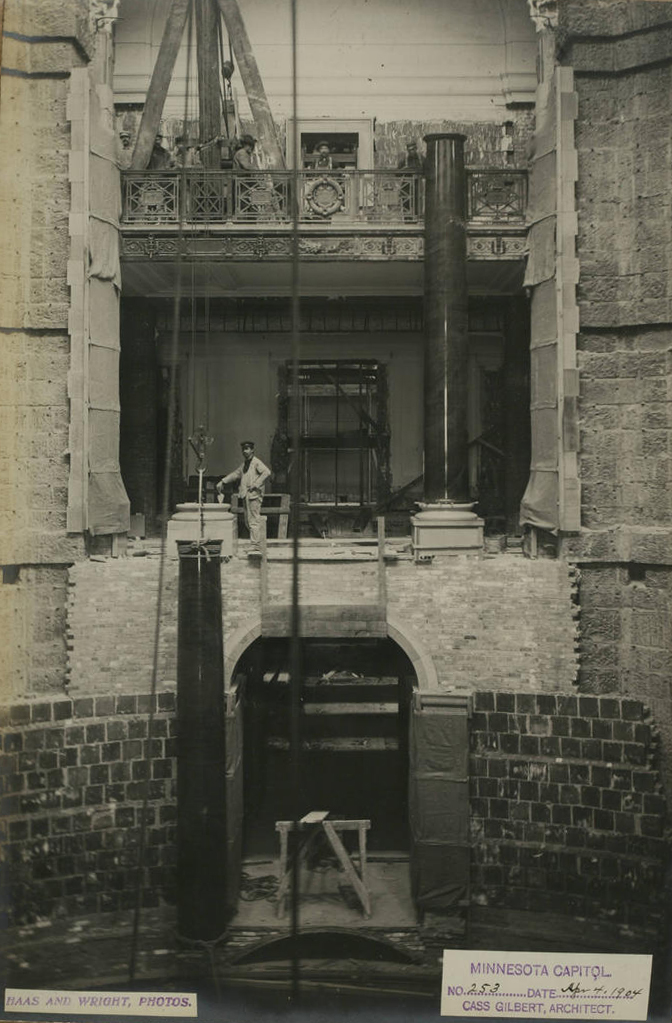
Setting a column in Capitol rotunda, 1904.

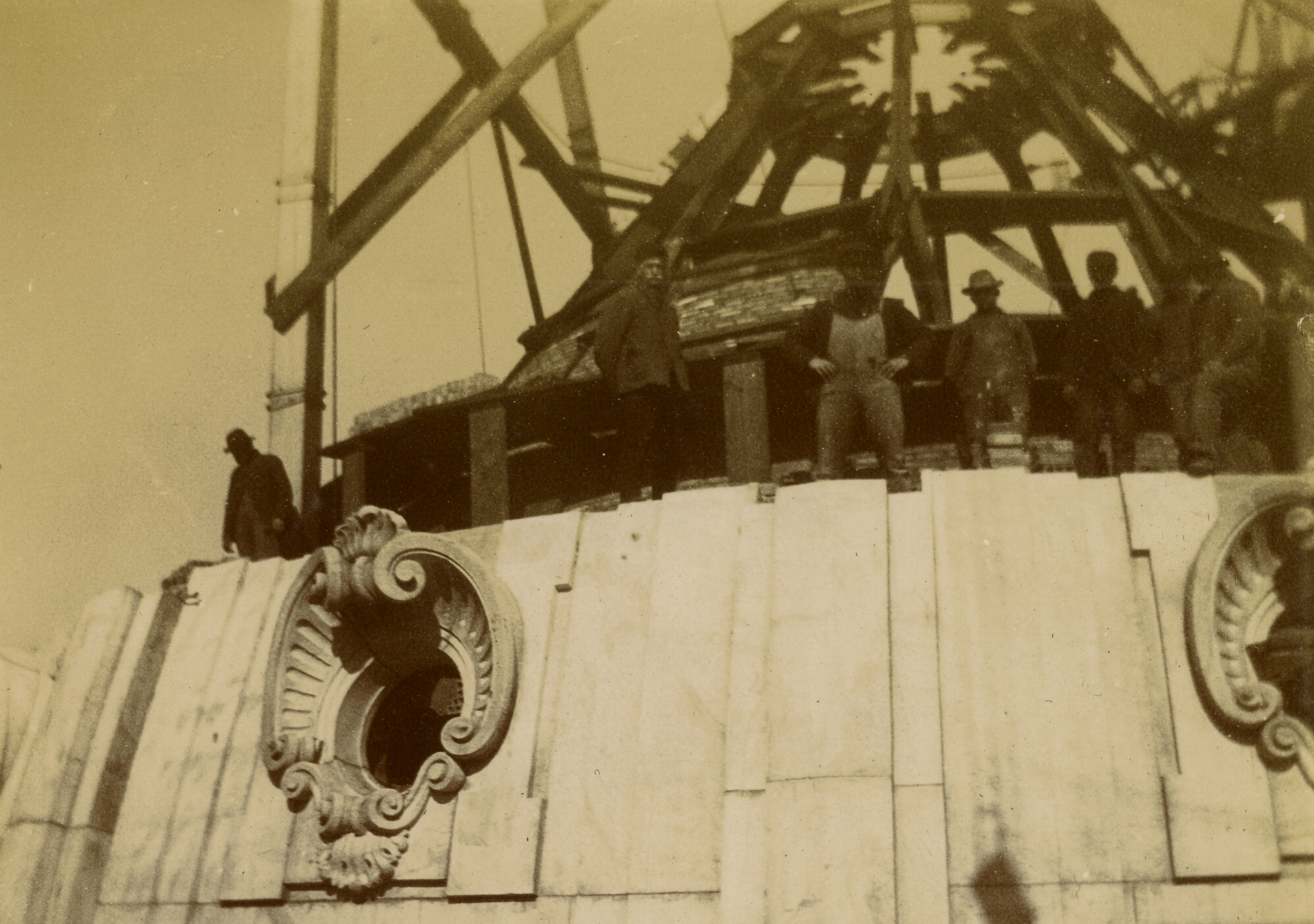
Workers building the State Capitol dome.

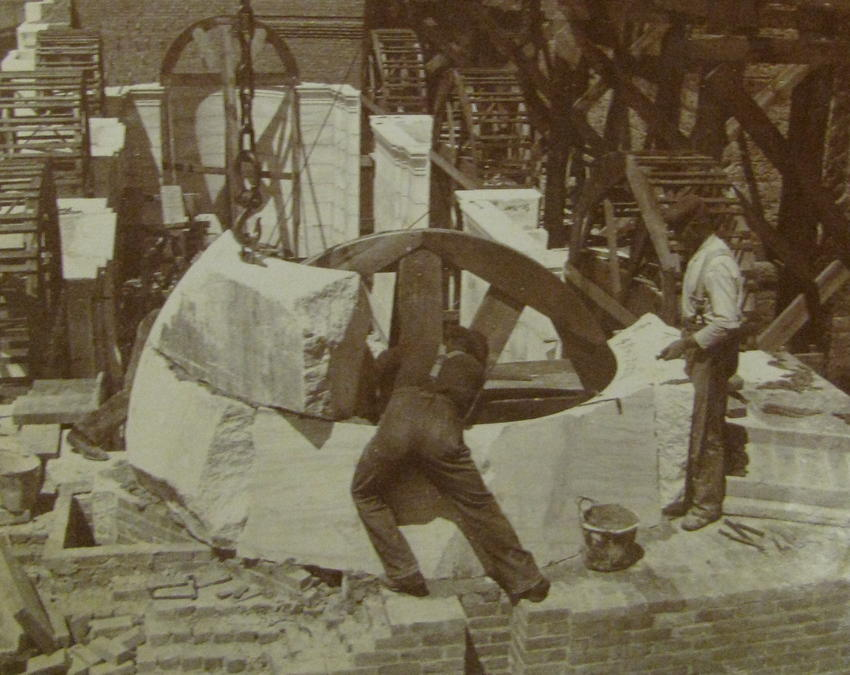
Workers setting rough stone in place, 1899.

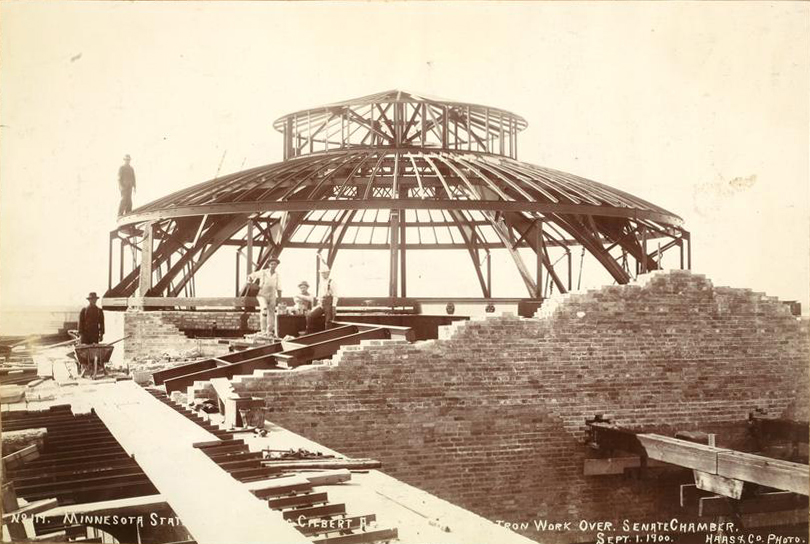
Iron workers constructing Senate Chamber dome, 1900.

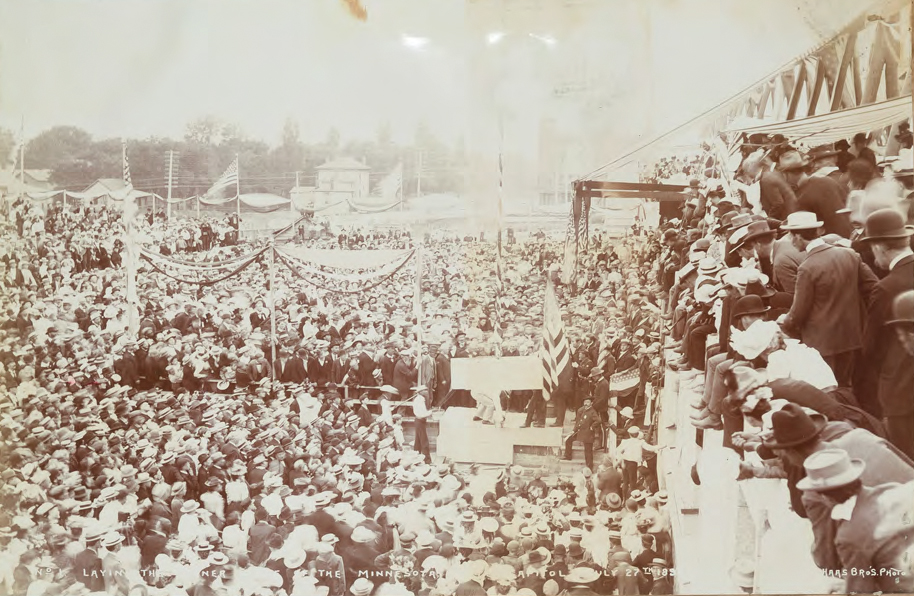
Laying the Minnesota State Capitol cornerstone, 1898

== See also ==
- Minnesota State Capitol
- Minnesota State Capitol artwork
- Minnesota Governor's Residence
