= First Minnesota State Capitol =

Capitol building in Minnesota, 1853–1881

Coordinates: 44.9496°N 93.0976°W

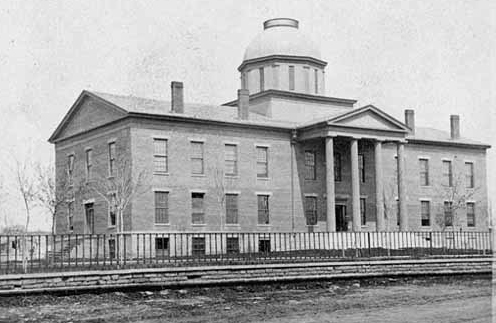
First Minnesota State Capitol, 1853–1872.

The first state capitol building was completed in 1853 and served as the seat of Minnesota's territorial and early state government until it burned in 1881.

Minnesota Territory was created when Congress passed the Organic Act of 1849 which gave the president of the United States power to appoint a territorial governor, secretary, chief justice, and other officials; called for the election of a nine-member council and an eighteen-member House of Representatives; and provided for a temporary seat of government in St. Paul until a capital city could be determined. Congress approved $20,000 to erect government buildings in the new capital.

The territorial legislature set up a temporary headquarters in the Central House Hotel in September 1849 and continued to meet in nonpermanent locations during the next three sessions. It wasn't until the second session that lawmakers turned their attention to the question of a permanent seat of government. The territorial government accepted an offer from Charles and Annie J. Bazille of a building site bounded by Tenth, Wabasha, Exchange, and Cedar Streets for the token price of one dollar.

In 1851, work began to oversee finances and the hiring of contractors to build the Capitol.

Its architect, N. C. Prentiss drew up specifications for the new Capitol that included digging a foundation measuring 125 feet by 65 feet and a stone foundation 4 feet high by 3 feet thick. Exterior details included brick work, cut stone floors and steps for the porches, a wood pediment, wood Ionic-style columns, and a well-framed roof covered with fireproof material. Interior work called for Norway pine flooring and staircases of oak and ash with oak handrails and turned balusters. The plan for the House of Representatives featured a viewing gallery on three sides of the chamber supported by columns. The specifications required the contractors to complete the work in a "good, substantial, workmanlike manner."

The legislature moved into the new Capitol in time for the 5th territorial legislative session on January 4, 1854.

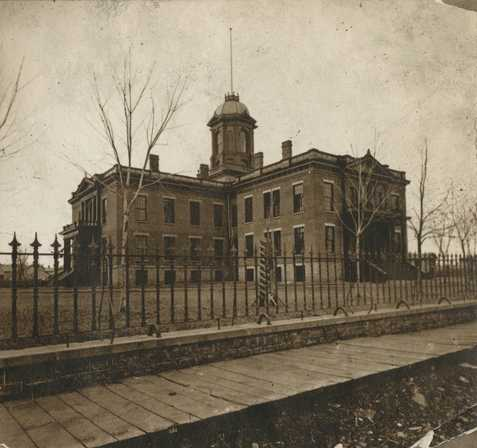
First Minnesota Capitol building, expanded. ca. 1873

As more people moved to the territory, the number of lawmakers needed to represent them grew. On May 11, 1858, Minnesota becomes the thirty-second state to enter the union. The population boomed when Minnesota became a state, and the small Capitol building needed improvements. Gas lighting replaced candles in 1867. Four years later, steam heat replaced wood-burning stoves and new plumbing brought city water into the building. Architect Abraham Radcliffe was hired to expand the Capitol with a new wing on the Exchange Street side of the building in 1873 and a second wing facing Wabasha Street in 1878. It was redesigned in the Italianate style popular at the time.

Despite efforts to make the Capitol fire-resistant, the threat of fire remained a concern. During repairs conducted a few days before the Minnesota Constitutional Convention in July 1857, a fire started on the west side of the cupola. There was little damage to the building, but the fire consumed some of the Minnesota Historical Society's collections stored there. While legislators met on the evening of March 1, 1881, another fire broke out in the dome of the capitol and quickly spread. Legislators and nearby residents rescued furniture, many important documents, and historical collections. There were no deaths, but efforts to save the building failed. Newspapers estimated the total loss at $180,000.

The newly completed Market House at Seventh and Wabasha Streets became the temporary home of state government the following day. The building housed government offices until the opening of a new state capitol in 1883.

== See also ==
- Minnesota State Capitol
- Second Minnesota State Capitol
