= Unique Theater =

Coordinates: 44°58′45.5″N 93°16′25″W

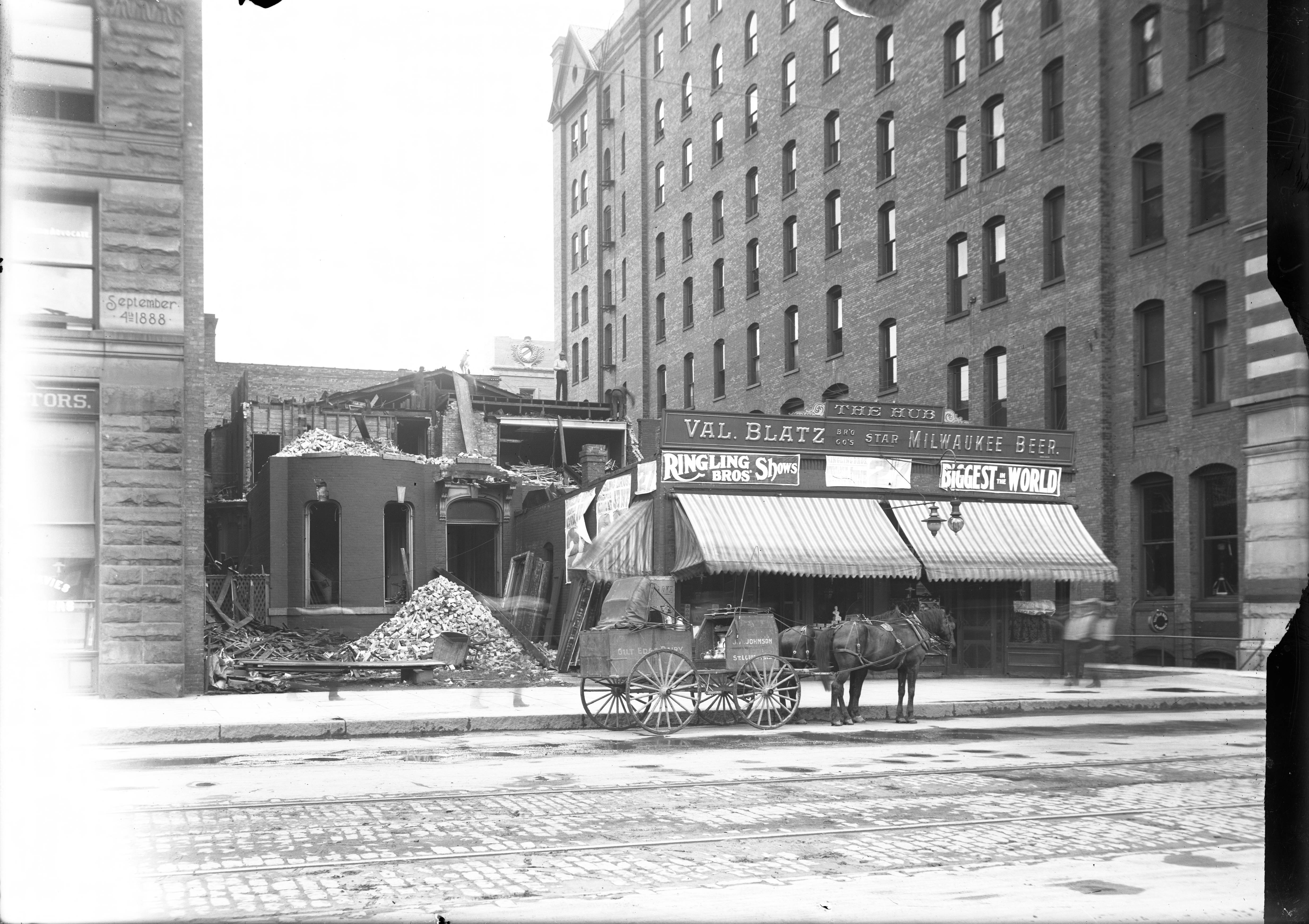
Site of the Unique Theater just prior to its construction (1903)

The Unique Theater was an 830-seat vaudeville theater, built in 1904 on Hennepin Avenue in downtown Minneapolis, Minnesota. It was built in the Renaissance Revival style, and situated between the Hennepin Center for the Arts and the West Hotel.

The hotel catered to a family audience with daily performances priced at ten or twenty cents.

== History ==
The theatre was used as a morgue after the West Hotel caught on fire next door.

Charlie Chaplin performed at the Unique very early in his career.

When vaudeville declined in the 1920s, however, the theater became a single-screen movie theater, built in the Renaissance Revival style.

The theatre was torn down in 1943 after being called a "menace to the public" due to poor structural integrity. Following demolition, the lot it had occupied was repurposed as a parking lot. (This was planned to be occupied by part of a Minnesota Shubert Performing Arts and Education Center, which was realized near the end of that century—though that eventual result entailed construction of a new building, which was—years later, without having opened to the public—raised from its foundation, and moved several blocks away, by extraordinary measures.
