= West Hotel =

Demolished luxury hotel in Minneapolis, Minnesota

Coordinates: 44°58′46.5″N 93°16′22″W

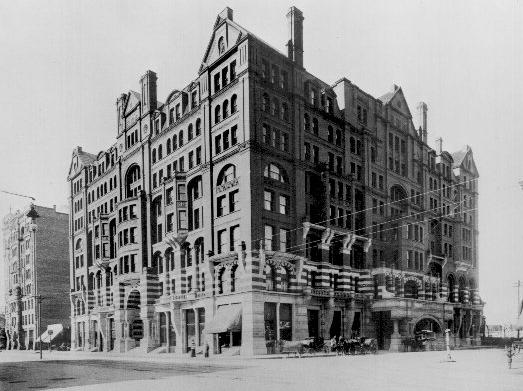
The West Hotel, 1896

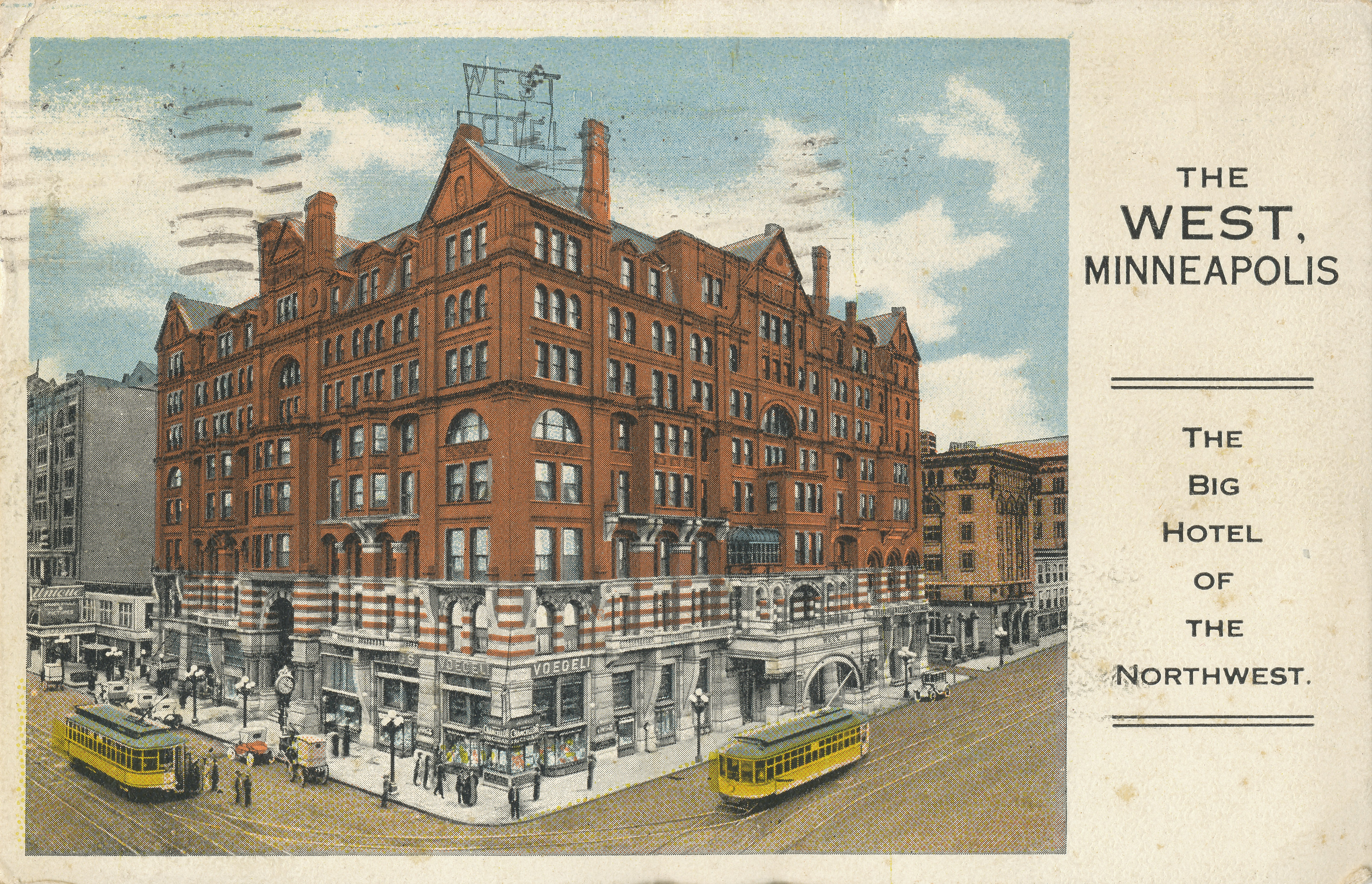
The West Hotel, 1916

Opened in 1884, the West Hotel was Minneapolis's first grand hotel. It had 407 luxuriously furnished rooms, 140 baths, and featured an immense and opulent lobby which was claimed to be the largest in the nation. These elements combined to make what was considered for a time to be the most luxurious hotel west of Chicago. The West was designed by LeRoy Buffington and built on land that was once owned by the first resident of Minneapolis, John H. Stevens. Buffington created the West in the Queen Anne style that was quite popular in the last decades of the 19th century.

The Queen Anne style featured an elaborate architectural look that included gable roofs, projecting bay windows, towers, and dormer windows. The West combined most of these concepts into a grand, larger than life look that seems graceless to some modern observers but was a popular building style at the time, a style that was introduced in 1876 at the Centennial Exposition in Philadelphia.

The West hotel was situated on the southwest corner of the intersection of Hennepin Avenue and Fifth Street (the site currently occupied, in part, by the Shubert Theatre, moved there in 1999), in the center of a burgeoning entertainment district that started coming together in the 1880s and was a temporary home to such well-known public figures as Mark Twain and Winston Churchill. It also catered to delegates of the 1892 Republican National Convention (held at the Exposition Building across the Mississippi River). It was Minneapolis's largest and most luxurious hotel for many years after its construction.

In 1906 a large fire burned through the hotel killing 10 people. The adjacent Unique Theater was used as a morgue. That and a general business downturn caused the West to go through a period of decline and finally in 1940 the West Hotel was demolished.
