= LeRoy Buffington =

American architect (1848–1931)

LeRoy S. Buffington, 1889

LeRoy Sunderland Buffington (1847–1931) was an American architect from Minnesota who specialized in hotels, public and commercial buildings, churches, and residences. He was born September 22, 1847, in Cincinnati, Ohio. He studied architecture and engineering at the University of Cincinnati and graduated in 1869. He later moved to Saint Paul, becoming a partner of Abraham Radcliffe, and worked on the remodeling of the original Minnesota State Capitol. After the first capitol burned down, Buffington designed a replacement that served as the State House until 1904. In 1881 he claimed to have invented the method of building skyscrapers using load-bearing iron frames. He applied for a patent in November 1887 and received it in May 1888. Even though many subsequent builders used this method of construction, Buffington was mostly unsuccessful in collecting royalties from his patent (one exception was for the Rand Tower in Minneapolis). Buffington remained in private practice in Minneapolis until his death on February 15, 1931.

Some of Buffington's works include:

- Pillsbury A-Mill (1881), Main Street and 3rd Avenue Southeast, Minneapolis (National Historic Landmark)
- First Saint Paul Union Depot (1881, burned 1913), Saint Paul
- Hotel Lafayette (1882, burned 1897), Minnetonka Beach
- Second Minnesota State Capitol (1882, demolished 1938), Wabasha Street, Saint Paul
- First Dakota Territorial Capitol (1883, burned 1930), East Boulevard, Bismarck
- Boston Block (1884, demolished 1942), Minneapolis
- Shipman-Greve House, 445 Summit Avenue, Saint Paul
- Minneapolis Tribune Building (1884, demolished 1889), Minneapolis
- West Hotel (1884, demolished 1940), Minneapolis
- Eddy Hall (1886), Pillsbury Hall (1889), Nicholson Hall (1890) and Burton Hall (1894), University of Minnesota (National Register of Historic Places)
- National/Mammoth Hotel (1893, demolished 1936), Yellowstone National Park
- Big Island Park (1906, demolished 1918), Orono
