= Second Minnesota State Capitol =

Coordinates: 44.9484°N 93.0978°W

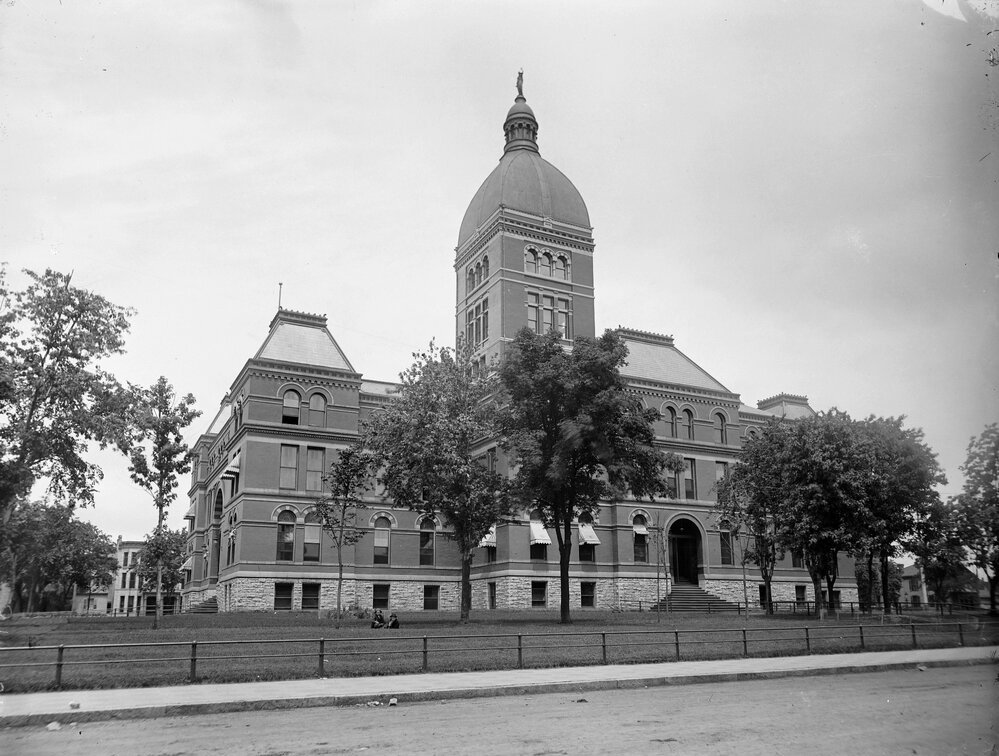
Second Minnesota State Capitol, circa 1890.

After fire destroyed the U.S. state of Minnesota's first capitol building on March 1, 1881, the second capitol, completed in 1883, served as the seat of Minnesota state government for just 10 years before state officials began planning a grander, more efficient Capitol. The second Capitol building stood on the site of the first Capitol for 55 years until its demolition in 1937.

The loss of the first capitol prompted quick action. The legislature approved $75,000 to cover costs to rebuild the capitol, assuming the reuse of the walls of the old Capitol and the governor issued a call for proposals in June. Architect Leroy S. Buffington won the contract.

When the old walls proved unstable, the legislature approved an additional $100,000 for a completely new building. The total budget came to $185,000 and carried the stipulation that costs could not exceed this amount. Exceeding the budget carried a misdemeanor penalty.

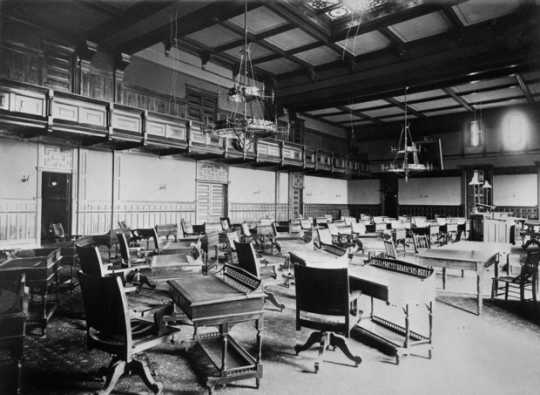
House Chamber, 2nd Minnesota State Capitol, ca. 1885

Buffington designed the new three-story building in the shape of a Greek cross. It featured a foundation of cut stone and walls of red brick with Dresbach sandstone trim. Each wing measured 150 feet in length. The central dome reached 200 feet in height. The main entrance on Wabasha Street opened onto the first floor, where the governor, attorney general, auditor, treasurer, and secretary of state had offices.

Two iron stairways led to the second floor from the rotunda. The Assembly (House of Representatives) chamber in the Tenth Street wing featured a twenty-five-foot ceiling with a large stained glass skylight. Eight windows provided natural light supplemented by two large chandeliers and four electric lights for evening sessions. A third-story viewing gallery ran across the south side of the room.

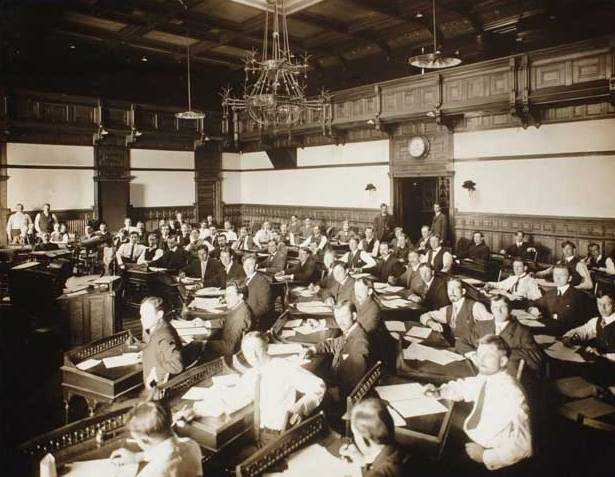
Senate Chamber, 2nd Minnesota State Capitol, ca. 1900

The Senate chamber, finished in yellow birch and birdseye maple, took up the Wabasha Street wing. A stained glass skylight, wine-colored stained glass windows in the gallery, a large chandelier, and four electric fixtures lit the chamber. Stairways from the hallways led to an upper visitors' gallery encircling the room.

The Supreme Court chamber in the Exchange Street wing featured woodwork of cherry and Hungarian ash. The court wing included five private rooms for the use of the judges, a retiring and consultation room for attorneys, and a law library.

The third floor housed House and Senate galleries, a large caucus room, and a committee room. The building had twenty meeting rooms on the upper two floors. The basement contained offices for the state historical society, supply rooms, a barber shop, and restrooms.

To minimize the threat of fire, slabs made of ashes and cement covered floors and walls. Buffington designed stairways of iron and slate. He covered the hallway surfaces in tile set in cement to prevent fire from spreading from one floor to the next. He included a separate forty-foot-square red brick boiler and engine house on the northeast corner of the Capitol square. Heat entered the main building through tunnels to radiators located throughout the building.

The ventilation system of four large air shafts running from basement to the roof, thought to be state-of-the-art, proved the fatal flaw in the building's design. Poor ventilation played a key role in the push for a new Capitol building in 1893.

Cost overruns dogged the project from the beginning. By March 1882 Buffington's estimate had risen to $245,000. Governor Lucius Hubbard knew that costs had to stay within the $185,000 appropriation. He estimated that another $40,000 would finish the building enough for it to host the 1883 legislative session and made an appeal for the money. Donations came from the public without conditions, and the legislature met for the first time in the nearly completed Capitol on January 2, 1883. To reimburse the private donors and complete the building, lawmakers approved another $175,000 during the 1883 session. State auditor reports from 1881 to 1884 show the total cost of the building as $359,897.60, nearly twice the original estimate.

Due to poor ventilation lack of space, and other building concerns, plans were laid for a new state Capitol. With the completion of the third state Capitol in 1905, the second state Capitol, after only being used as a statehouse for 22 years, was used for meeting space, storage, and parking until its demolition in 1937, 55 years after being built.

== See also ==
- Minnesota State Capitol
- First Minnesota State Capitol
