= University of Minnesota System =

Public university system in Minnesota

- Type: Public university system
- Location: Minnesota
- Website: system.umn.edu

University of Minnesota System campuses

The University of Minnesota System is a public university system with five campuses spread across the U.S. state of Minnesota.

The university system's campuses are in the Twin Cities, Crookston, Duluth, Morris, and Rochester. The university also operates several research facilities around the state, including some large parcels of land. The Twin Cities, Crookston, Duluth, Morris and Rochester campuses are accredited by the Higher Learning Commission (HLC). The other public system of higher education in the state is the larger Minnesota State Colleges and Universities system (Minnesota State System, previously MnSCU).

The university system receives annual funding from the State of Minnesota.

== Campuses ==
The flagship Twin Cities campus is the largest in the system, with a total enrollment of 57,879 students (undergraduate, graduate, professional, and non-degree included) in fall 2025. In the same year Crookston had 2,873, Duluth had 9,529, Morris had 982, and Rochester had 747, bringing the system-wide total to 72,010.

The colors of the university, which are used system-wide, are maroon and gold.

=== Twin Cities ===
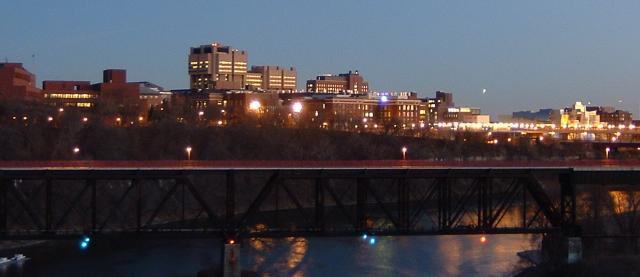
Minneapolis Campus at night

The University of Minnesota - Twin Cities (UMTC) is the largest with locations in Minneapolis and neighboring Saint Paul (actually, the suburb of Falcon Heights). The locations are connected via a dedicated bus transitway. The buildings on each campus are connected by a series of tunnels and above-ground skyways called The Gopher Way. The campus is the oldest and largest in the system and has the seventh-largest main campus student body in the United States, with 57,879 students at the start of the 2025-26 academic year.

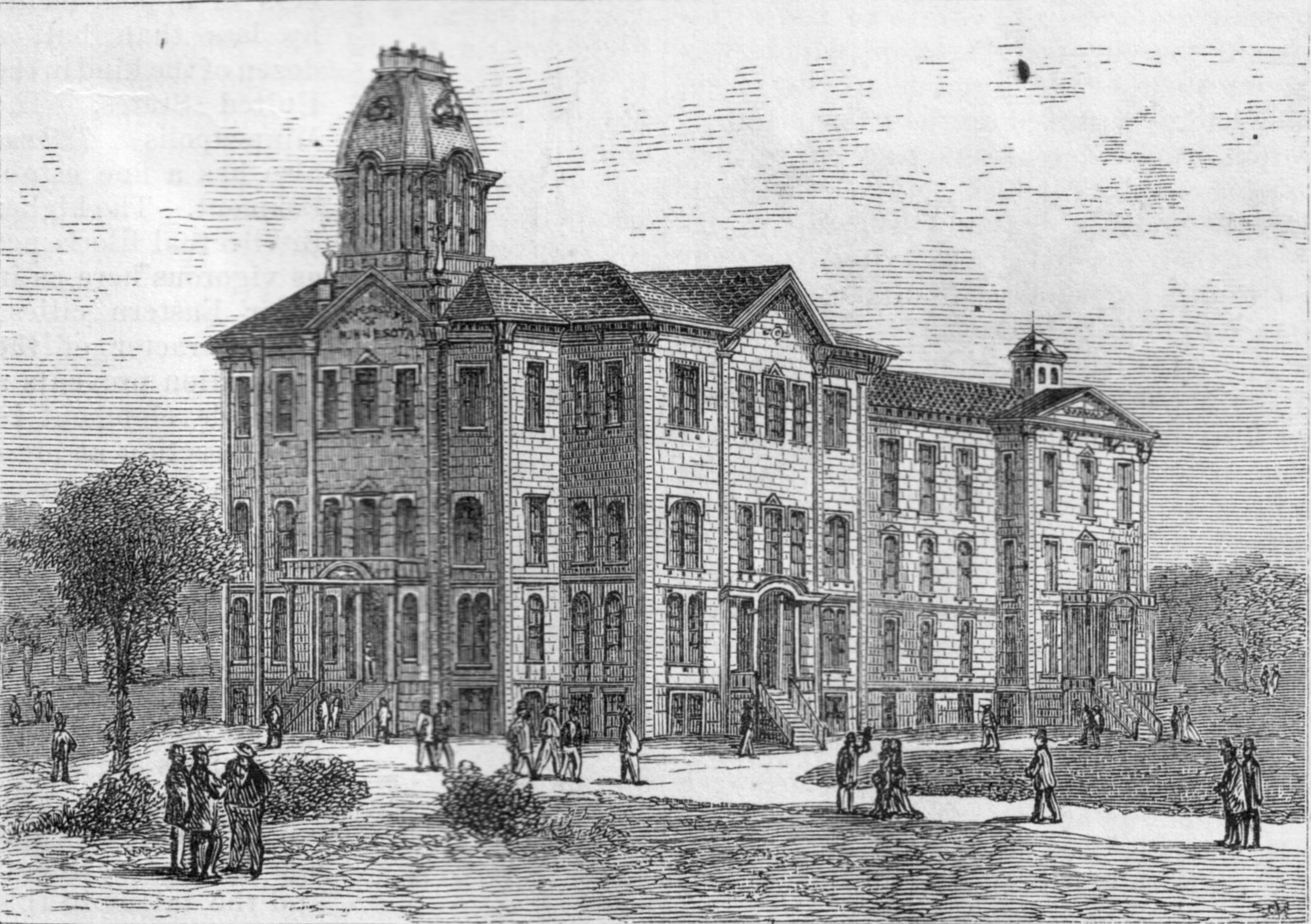
The original University of Minnesota building in Minneapolis, 1875

The Minneapolis portion is the largest and has a number of colleges dedicated to a variety of subjects. The Twin Cities campus located in Minneapolis can be further subdivided into the East Bank (main portion) and West Bank, as the Mississippi River flows through it. Students become well-acquainted with the double-decker Washington Avenue Bridge that connects the two sections. There are a number of distinguished graduate and professional schools on the Minneapolis campus, notably the College of Science and Engineering, University of Minnesota Law School, Medical School, Carlson School of Management, School of Public Health, and Hubert H. Humphrey Institute of Public Affairs. In addition, Minneapolis houses many research facilities such as The Cancer Center.

The Twin Cities campus located in St Paul is home to the University of Minnesota College of Food, Agricultural and Natural Resource Sciences, University of Minnesota College of Design, and University of Minnesota College of Biological Sciences programs, the University of Minnesota School of Social Work, the College of Veterinary Medicine, and a variety of additional programs and student services. The Bell Museum of Natural History is also located on the campus in St. Paul.

The mascot for the Twin Cities campus is Goldy Gopher, and the sports teams are called the Minnesota Golden Gophers. They participate in the NCAA's Division I and the football team participates in the Football Bowl Subdivision (FBS). The majority of the teams compete in the Big Ten Conference, however, the women's hockey program competes in the Western Collegiate Hockey Association.

Among the graduates from this campus are two former U.S. Vice Presidents, Hubert Humphrey and Walter Mondale, former NAACP president Roy Wilkins, British Deputy Prime Minister Nick Clegg, several Nobel Prize winners, several athletes such as Ric Flair, Kevin McHale, Dave Winfield, Patty Berg, Brock Lesnar, Curt Hennig, Shelton Benjamin, Bobby Jackson of the NBA, and composer Yanni. Folksinger Bob Dylan famously attended the University and was a part of its thriving "West Bank" music scene, but did not graduate. A wide variety of medical and technological innovations have taken place there as well. For instance, the Internet Gopher protocol was created at the Twin Cities campus. A predecessor of sorts to the World Wide Web, it was named after the school mascot.

Campus media includes the Minnesota Daily newspaper, The Wake Student Magazine, and 770 Radio K (KUOM), an AM radio station that is probably the oldest in the state.

=== Crookston ===
The University of Minnesota Crookston (UMC) joined the university system in 1966. At that time it was known as the University of Minnesota Technical Institute at Crookston. Since 1993 the Crookston campus has offered bachelor's degrees, and it has grown to be a more comprehensive regional college campus. It is known for its focus on experiential learning and technology, and through fees each student is provided a laptop computer as part of their experience. The campus mascot is Regal the Eagle, and the athletics teams are known as the Golden Eagles and they compete in the Northern Sun Intercollegiate Conference of the NCAA Division II.

=== Duluth ===
The University of Minnesota Duluth (UMD) became part of the system in 1947, though the campus has a history stretching back to 1895 when it was formed as the Normal School at Duluth.

Its men's hockey program competes in the National Collegiate Hockey Conference and its women's hockey program competes in the Western Collegiate Hockey Association. UMD baseball, men's and women's basketball, men's and women's cross country, football, men's and women's track and field, soccer, softball, tennis, and volleyball are Division II teams as a part of the Northern Sun Intercollegiate Conference. Their teams are nicknamed Bulldogs. and their mascot is Champ.

Among the graduates from UMD are former Lieutenant Governor of Minnesota Yvonne Prettner Solon, former Duluth mayor Emily Larson, and former Duluth mayor Don Ness. Brian Kobilka received the 2012 Nobel Prize in Chemistry. UMD has produced numerous professional hockey players including John Harrington and Mark Pavelich from the 1980 Miracle on Ice Olympic hockey team, and NHL Hall of Famer Brett Hull.

Campus media includes The Bark newspaper; until 2021, UMD also owned radio station KUMD-FM (now WDSE-FM).

=== Morris ===
The University of Minnesota Morris (UMM) joined the system in 1960. UMN Morris is a public liberal arts college.

The campus offers 34 majors, 35 minors, and 13 licensure areas, along with the option to create one's own major. The student-to-faculty ratio is 13:1, and students are able to engage in undergraduate research and internships with faculty members. Their athletic program competes in the Upper Midwest Athletic Conference as a part of the NCAA Division III. One in five students also participates in NCAA Division III Intercollegiate Athletics as a Cougar athlete.

With tuition a quarter of Minnesota's most expensive private school and 96% of incoming students receiving financial aid, UMN Morris students graduate with the lowest student loan debt in the University of Minnesota system.

=== Rochester ===
The University of Minnesota Rochester (UMR) is the public undergraduate health sciences university. UMR is the newest campus of the University of Minnesota system, having been formally established in December 2006 (although the University of Minnesota has offered classes in Rochester as a satellite site since as early as 1966).

UMR has no NCAA athletic teams, but it does have a mascot, the Rochester Raptor.

UMR, located in University Square in downtown Rochester, is neighbor to world-renowned Mayo Clinic.

Programs offered:

- B.S. in Health Professions (BSHP) is an educational collaboration with Mayo Clinic School of Health Sciences offering tracks in Echocardiography, Respiratory Care, Radiography and Sonography
- B.S. in Health Sciences (BSHS) prepares students for health care careers, graduate education and professional degrees. The Nursing Guarantee program and 3+2 Physician Assistant Master's Degree program fall under this degree.
- Masters and Ph.D. in Biomedical Informatics and Computational Biology
- Partnership programs offered: Masters of Business Administration, Bachelor of Nursing, and Masters of Occupational Therapy.

=== Waseca ===
The Waseca campus opened in 1971 and closed in 1992. Their mascot was "Ramus" the ram. During its operation, it maintained a college cable-FM radio station with the call letters KUMW. Campus buildings became part of a low-security federal prison for women (see Federal Correctional Institution, Waseca). The University still operates an agricultural outreach program in the city.

== History ==
List of presidents
| Number | Name | Dates |
|---|---|---|
| 1st | William Watts Folwell | 1869–1884 |
| 2nd | Cyrus Northrop | 1884–1911 |
| 3rd | George Vincent | 1911–1917 |
| 4th | Marion Burton | 1917–1920 |
| 5th | Lotus Coffman | 1920–1938 |
| 6th | Guy Stanton Ford | 1938–1941 |
| 7th | Walter Coffey | 1941–1945 |
| 8th | James Morrill | 1945–1960 |
| 9th | O. Meredith Wilson | 1960–1967 |
| 10th | Malcolm Moos | 1967–1974 |
| | E. W. Ziebarth | 1974–1974 (interim) |
| 11th | C. Peter Magrath | 1974–1984 |
| 12th | Kenneth H. Keller | 1984–1985 (interim); 1985–1988 |
| | Richard J. Sauer | 1988–1989 (interim) |
| 13th | Nils Hasselmo | 1989–1997 |
| 14th | Mark G. Yudof | 1997–2002 |
| 15th | Robert H. Bruininks | 2002–2011 |
| 16th | Eric W. Kaler | 2011–2019 |
| 17th | Joan Gabel | 2019-2023 |
| *interim | Jeffrey Ettinger | 2023-2024 |
| 18th | Rebecca Cunningham | 2024-Present |

The University of Minnesota was founded in Minneapolis in 1851 as a college preparatory school, seven years prior to Minnesota's statehood. As such, the University of Minnesota enjoys much autonomy from other operations of the state government. The school was closed during the American Civil War, but reopened in 1867. Minneapolis businessman John Sargent Pillsbury is known today as the "Father of the University", and aided the campus through financial troubles as a regent, state senator, and governor. The Morrill Land Grant Colleges Act also helped provide funding for the University of Minnesota.

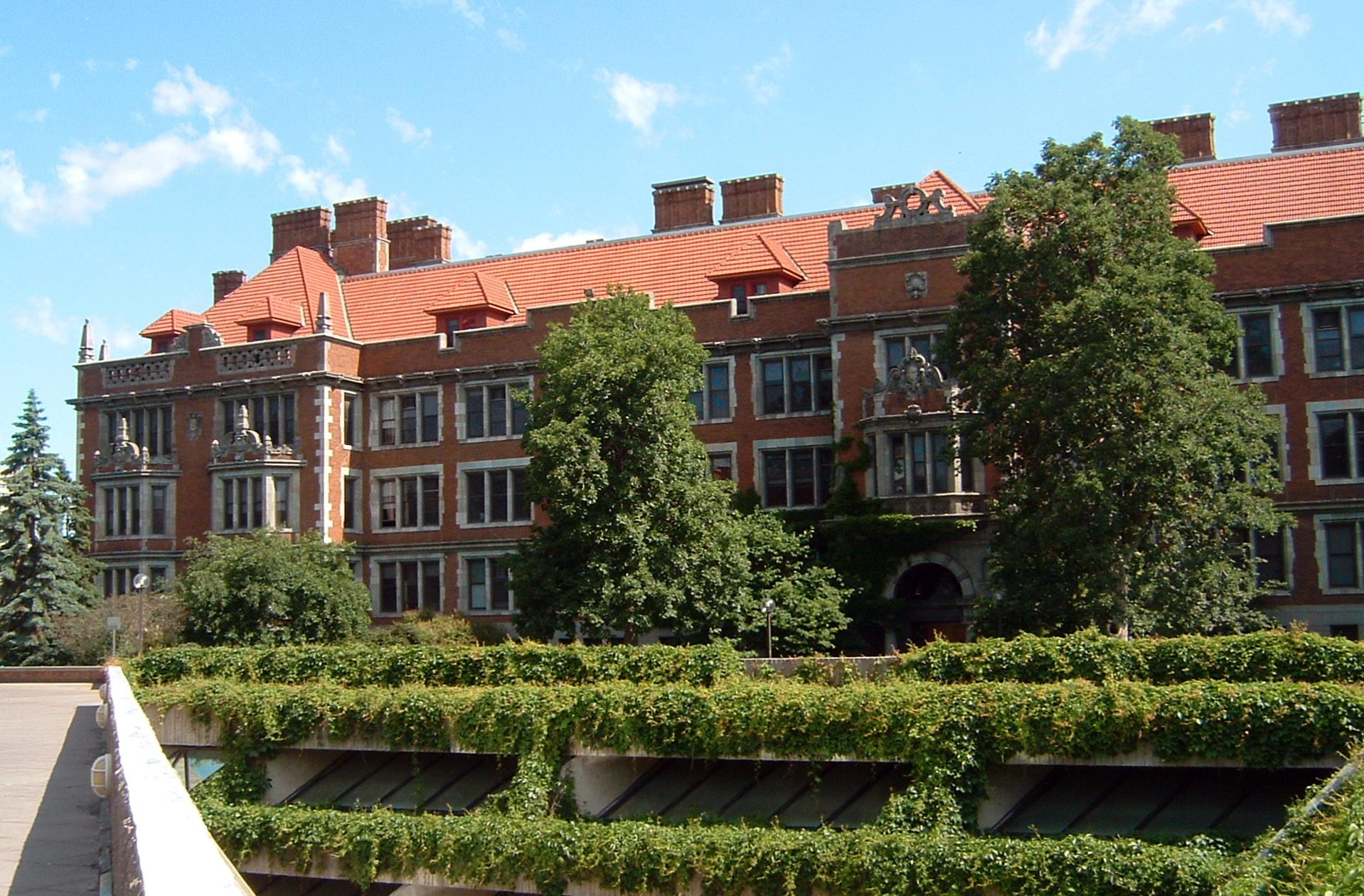
Folwell Hall

In 1869 the school reorganized and became an institution of higher education. William Watts Folwell served as the University of Minnesota's first president. An official residence known as Eastcliff has been used by six university presidents since 1958. The 20-room house, originally built by lumber baron Edward Brooks, Sr., was added to the National Register of Historic Places in 2000.

During the traditional autumn through spring year, classes are not held on Thanksgiving Day or the Friday after, and the school traditionally has an extended break covering Christmas and New Year's Day. Classes don't resume in January until the day after Martin Luther King, Jr. Day. A week-long spring break occurs after the eighth week of the spring term, which sometimes coincides with Easter.

== Sources of funding ==
As of 2007, the University of Minnesota maintained an endowment of $2.8 billion. Also, as a public university, the system received an estimated $641 million from the State of Minnesota. The system's total budget for FY 2006 was $2.36 billion.

== Additional properties ==
There are several other research and outreach centers across the state operated by the University of Minnesota - Twin Cities or by the university system. As of September 2004, these areas plus the campuses are spread across 28,300 acres (44 miles² or 115 km^{2}). Other areas owned by the state and university bring this up to a total of 57,200 acres (89 miles² or 231 km^{2})

- Cedar Creek Ecosystem Science Reserve
- Cloquet Forestry Center
- Coleraine Minerals Research Laboratory
- Hormel Institute
- Excelsior Horticultural Research Center
- Itasca Biological Station and Laboratories
- Lamberton Southwest Research and Outreach Center
- Magnuson Research Farm
- Minnesota Landscape Arboretum
- Minnesota Poultry Testing Laboratory]
- Natural Resources Research Institute
- North Central Research and Outreach Center
- Northwest Research and Outreach Center
- O'Brien Observatory - Marine-on-St. Croix
- Sand Plain Research Farm
- Soudan Underground Mine State Park
- Southern Research and Outreach Center
- U of M Outreach and Research Education Park
- West Central Research and Outreach
