= David J. Mulla =

American soil/water scientist

David J. Mulla is an American soil scientist. He played a role in the organization of the International Conference on Precision Agriculture (ICPA), which started as a small workshop in Minneapolis in the early 1990s and developed into the International Society of Precision Agriculture (ISPA). Until 2008, the meetings of the ICPA were hosted by the University of Minnesota. In 2013, he published a review of advances in remote sensing for precision agriculture.

He holds the W.E. Larson Chair in Soil and Water Resources in the Department of Soil, Water, and Climate in the College of Food, Agricultural and Natural Resources Science (CFANS) at the University of Minnesota. He was also Director of the Precision Agriculture Center at the University of Minnesota, which was established in 1995 and was the first Center of its kind. In June 2023, he became a member of the Executive Advisory Committee of AI-CLIMATE, an AI Institute led by the University of Minnesota announced in May 2023 and supported by the National Science Foundation and the National Institute of Food and Agriculture. The AI-CLIMATE team apply artificial intelligence to develop methods of estimating the amount of carbon sequestered in a field or forestry plot.

== Education ==
Mulla received a BS in Earth Science in 1979 from the University of California, Riverside, and an MS in Agronomy in 1981 from Purdue University. His PhD in Agronomy (1983) with an emphasis on soil physics was also from Purdue University. Mulla's PhD dissertation was entitled "The molecular dynamics, specific surface area, crystal composition, and swelling of clay-water systems."

== Career ==
Mulla began his academic career in 1983 as an assistant professor in the Department of Crop and Soil Sciences at Washington State University (WSU) and was promoted to professor in 1993. He came to the University of Minnesota in March 1995 and since then has been Larson Chair for Soil and Water Resources in the Department of Soil, Water, and Climate at the University of Minnesota (CFANS). He was director of the Precision Agriculture Center at the University of Minnesota from January 2004 to July 2023 and was appointed a Founding Fellow of the Institute on the Environment at the University of Minnesota in 2007.

== Research ==
Mulla has more than 220 publications with a transdisciplinary range of coauthors. His research includes precision agriculture and precision conservation, watershed management and modeling, and agricultural water quality.

He and his colleagues have applied geostatistics, remote sensing, and GIS terrain analysis to precision agriculture. Mulla's work in precision agriculture includes the concept and development of management zones. His work in modeling water quality includes the transport of nitrogen, phosphorus, pesticides and sediment to either surface or groundwater. This includes research on hypoxia in the Gulf of Mexico (the so-called Dead Zone) that results from the loss of nitrogen and phosphorus from fertilizer in agricultural areas far upstream from the Gulf, including Minnesota. In 1998, this work led to him being appointed to the White House Task Force on Hypoxia in the Gulf of Mexico, which was established in 1997.

He assesses the efficacy of Best Management Practices (BMPs). In 2007, he was part of a study for the Legislative-Citizen Commission on Minnesota Resources (LCCMR) to develop a long-range conservation plan for biofuel production and environmental protection in Minnesota, and from 2010 to 2014, he led a study for the Minnesota state legislature on agricultural nitrogen and phosphorus sources affecting surface water quality. In 2023, he developed an alternative approach at utility-scale ground-mounted solar facilities to account for impacts on stormwater runoff from precipitation, solar array spacing and orientation, disconnected impervious surfaces, soil depth and bulk density, and perennial vegetation between arrays.

In 2011, he was appointed to a National Academy of Sciences (NAS) committee on numerical nutrient criteria (water quality standards) for Florida, which issued a report the following year. In 2013, he was appointed to the NAS committee on Mississippi River water quality assessment and monitoring, which organized a workshop on Mississippi water quality management.

The geographical scope of Mulla's work extends to the Palouse region of eastern Washington as well as more than twenty countries, including Morocco, Turkey, Indonesia, India, and China. In Morocco, he collaborated on a Millennium Challenge Corporation project that resulted in planting 8 million olive trees to control erosion and sequester carbon on 75,000 ha (750 sq km) of rainfed land.

== Honors ==
Mulla has been recognized for his research and contributions to the field:

- 1997: Fellow in the Soil Science Society of America (SSSA)
- 1999: Fellow in the Agronomy Society of America
- 2012: Pierre C. Robert Precision Senior Scientist Agriculture Research Award from the International Society for Precision Agriculture
- 2013: SSSA Soil Science Applied Research Award

He has also served as associate and technical editor for the Soil Science Society of America Journal, and as associate editor for the journal Precision Agriculture
