= List of presidents of the University of Minnesota =

President of the University of Minnesota
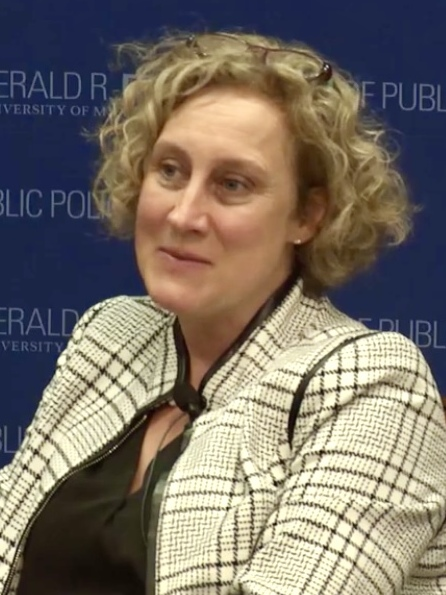
- Incumbent; Rebecca Cunningham since 2023 (3 years ago)
- Appointer: University of Minnesota Board of Regents
- Formation: 1851 (175 years ago)
- First holder: William Watts Folwell, 1869–1884
- Website: Office of the President

This list of presidents and principals of the University of Minnesota includes all who have served as president of University of Minnesota.

== Presidents ==
No.	Image	Name	Term start	Term end	Refs.
1		William Watts Folwell	1869	1884	
2		Cyrus Northrop	1884	1911	
3		George Edgar Vincent	1911	1917	
4		Marion Burton	1917	1920	
5		Lotus D. Coffman	1920	1938	
6		Guy Stanton Ford	1938	1941	
7		Walter Coffey	1941	1945	
8		James Morrill	1945	1960	
9		O. Meredith Wilson	1960	1967	
10		Malcolm Moos	1967	1974	
11		C. Peter Magrath	1974	1984	
12		Kenneth H. Keller	1985	1988	
13		Nils Hasselmo	1988	1997	
14		Mark G. Yudof	July 1, 1997	July 31, 2002	
interim		Robert H. Bruininks	August 1, 2002	November 8, 2002	
15		Robert H. Bruininks	November 8, 2002	June 30, 2011	
16		Eric W. Kaler	July 1, 2011	June 30, 2019	
17		Joan Gabel	July 1, 2019	June 9, 2023	
interim		Jeff Ettinger	June 10, 2023	June 30, 2024	
18		Rebecca Cunningham	July 1, 2024	Present	

== See also ==
- List of University of Minnesota people
