= Western Collegiate Club Hockey Association =

- Conference: ACHA
- Founded: 2003
- Commissioner: Ryan Donovan (since 2004)
- Sports fielded: Men's ice hockey
- Division: Division II
- No. of teams: 14
- Region: Upper Midwest
- Most recent champions: Wisconsin (2nd title)
- Most titles: Minnesota (5 titles)
- Website: Official website

The Western Collegiate Club Hockey Association (WCCHA) is a conference of men's club ice hockey teams from the American Collegiate Hockey Association (ACHA) competing at the Division II level. The participating teams come from colleges and universities in the Upper Midwest, including North Dakota, Minnesota and Wisconsin. Teams in the WCCHA are primarily student-run sports clubs with limited University funding, requiring significant player dues and fundraising for team operation.

The current 14 members are split between two geographic divisions, the Northwest and the Southeast. Within the division, each team plays each other twice, with two further interdivision series played. The top three finishers in each division qualify for the WCCHA Tournament. The remaining two teams to qualify (8 total) do so via league-only KRACH Rankings, which include all games between WCCHA opponents (divisional and interdivisional).

Since the 2016–2017 season, the winner of the Carla Berg Cup Championship earns the automatic bid to the ACHA D2 Central Regional Tournament.

== Teams ==
Institution	Location	Joined league	WCCHA titles	Division	Division Titles (since 2017–18)
Bethel	Saint Paul, Minnesota	2017	0	Northwest	0
Gustavus Adolphus	Saint Peter, Minnesota	2019	0	Southeast	1
Minnesota-Crookston	Crookston, Minnesota	2021	0	Northwest	0
Minnesota	Minneapolis, Minnesota	2003	5	Northwest	3
Minnesota Duluth	Duluth, Minnesota	2003, 2010, 2016	1	Southeast	0
Minnesota State	Mankato, Minnesota	2003, 2015	3	Southeast	0
North Dakota State University	Fargo, North Dakota	2014	0	Northwest	0
University of North Dakota	Grand Forks, North Dakota	2015	0	Northwest	0
St. Cloud State University	St. Cloud, Minnesota	2003	3	Northwest	1
St. John's University	St. Joseph, Minnesota	2019	0	Northwest	0
St. Thomas	St. Paul, Minnesota	2006	4	Southeast	2
Winona State	Winona, Minnesota	2016, 2018^	0	Southeast	0
Wisconsin	Madison, Wisconsin	2009	2	Southeast	1
Wisconsin-Eau Claire	Eau Claire, Wisconsin	2013	3	Southeast	0

^associate member for 2018–2019 season

== Past member teams ==
- Michigan Technological University (2003–11)
- Northern Michigan University (2011–14)
- St. Olaf College (2007–10)
- Waldorf College (2012–14)
- Winona State University (2016–17)
- Wisconsin-Superior (2017–2019)
- Wisconsin-La Crosse (2016–2020)

== History ==
The Western Collegiate Club Hockey Association was formed in March 2003 at the initial league meeting at Coffman Memorial Union on the campus of the Minnesota-Minneapolis. The five original members were Michigan Tech, Minnesota, Minnesota-Duluth, Minnesota State and St. Cloud State.

From 2004 to 2009, the WCCHA Tournament was held at the Herb Brooks National Hockey Center in St. Cloud, Minnesota, home of the St. Cloud State University Huskies. In 2010, the tournament moved to the neutral venue Schwan Super Rink at the National Sports Center. In 2014, the tournament moved for one year to the Coon Rapids Ice Center. Since 2015, the tournament has been held at the NSC Super Rink.

From 2003 to 2017, the WCCHA regular season included a full, single table schedule with every member playing each other twice. Following the growth of the league to 12 teams in 2017, the league introduced a new format, placing teams into two-6 team divisions based on geography. In 2019–2020, the WCCHA will feature 14 teams in two-7 team divisions.

Due to the ongoing COVID-19 pandemic and a majority of teams excluded from travel/competition, the league cancelled the 2020-2021 conference season.

== Past champions ==
Season	Winner
2003–04	Minnesota
2004–05	Minnesota State, Mankato
2005–06	Minnesota
2006–07	St. Cloud State
2007–08	Minnesota
2008–09	Minnesota State, Mankato
2009–10	St. Cloud State
2010–11	Minnesota
2011–12	St. Cloud State
2012–13	Minnesota-Duluth
2013–14	St. Thomas
2014–15	UW-Eau Claire
2015–16	UW-Eau Claire
2016–17	Minnesota State, Mankato
2017–18	Minnesota
2018–19	St. Thomas
2019–20	UW-Eau Claire
2020–21	*season cancelled*
2021–22	Wisconsin
2022–23	St. Thomas
2023–24	St. Thomas
2024–25	Wisconsin

== WCCHA at Regionals ==
Since regional play began, the WCCHA has been represented at the Central Regional Tournament eleven times. Regional winners move on to play in the ACHA National Tournament.

2006-07: Minnesota State becomes the first conference team to qualify.

2007-08: St. Thomas qualified, losing in the regional semifinal.

2008-09: St. Thomas lost in the Regional final.

2009-10: St. Thomas qualified, losing in the regional semifinal.

2010-11: St. Cloud State qualified, losing in the regional semifinal.

2011-12: St. Cloud State qualified, losing in the regional semifinal.

2012-13: Northern Michigan faced Michigan State, losing 1–0 in Overtime. Michigan State would go on to become the Division II National Champion.

2013-14: Waldorf College faced Illinois State in the regional semifinal, losing 8–1.

2015-16: #12 North Dakota faced #9 Michigan State in the regional semifinal, losing 4–2.

2016-17: #12 Minnesota State faced #9 Michigan in the Regional Play-In, losing 5–4 in Overtime.

2017-18: #10 Minnesota faced #11 Michigan in the Regional Play-In, winning 6–3. Minnesota then faced #4 Lindenwood in the regional semifinal, losing 3–2 in double overtime.

2018-19: #11 Minnesota faced #10 St. Thomas in the Regional Play-In, winning 5–2. Minnesota then faced #4 Marian in the regional semifinal, losing 5–1.

2019-20: #5 St. Thomas will face #8 Davenport; #10 Wisconsin will face #11 Minnesota in the Regional Play-In; #12 UW-Eau Claire will face #9 Grand Valley State in the Regional Play-In.

2020-21: Due to COVID-19, the ACHA did not hold Regionals
