= E. W. Ziebarth =

American radio broadcaster and university professor/administrator

E. W. ("Easy") Ziebarth
- Ziebarth c. 1950s

Interim President of the University of Minnesota
- Preceded by: Malcolm Moos
- Succeeded by: C. Peter Magrath

Personal details
- Born: October 4, 1910 Columbus, Wisconsin
- Died: February 27, 2001 (aged 90) Minneapolis, Minnesota

E. W. ("Easy") Ziebarth (October 4, 1910 – February 27, 2001) was an American radio broadcaster, professor and administrator at the University of Minnesota. Born in 1910 in Columbus, Wisconsin, Ziebarth attended the University of Wisconsin–Madison for his undergraduate and master's degrees before coming to the University of Minnesota to begin his doctoral studies in speech and communication in 1937. Ziebarth would remain at the University of Minnesota as a professor of speech for over 40 years. He also served as the dean of the College of Liberal Arts from 1963 to 1973 and as interim university president in 1974 after the departure of Malcolm Moos.

Ziebarth also had a long career in broadcasting beginning at the University of Minnesota's Radio K (then called WLB). Later he joined WCCO Radio and also served as a foreign correspondence for CBS. His 1950s program This I Believe was broadcast internationally via Voice of America in six different languages. He was also involved in the initial setup of Twin Cities Public Television's studios on the University of Minnesota's St. Paul campus.

Ziebarth won two Peabody awards for his work. The first in 1959 was awarded to WCCO for a series of programs on international relations. Ziebarth had traveled to the Soviet Union with a small group of academics and journalists and reported back on his experience. His second came in 1971 for a WCCO radio program he did entitled "The Heart of the Matter" which chronicled his own open heart surgery.

Ziebarth retired from teaching in the late 1970s. He died in 2001. A collection of his papers can be accessed at the University Archives, University of Minnesota - Twin Cities.
