= Lotus Coffman =

American university president (1875–1938)

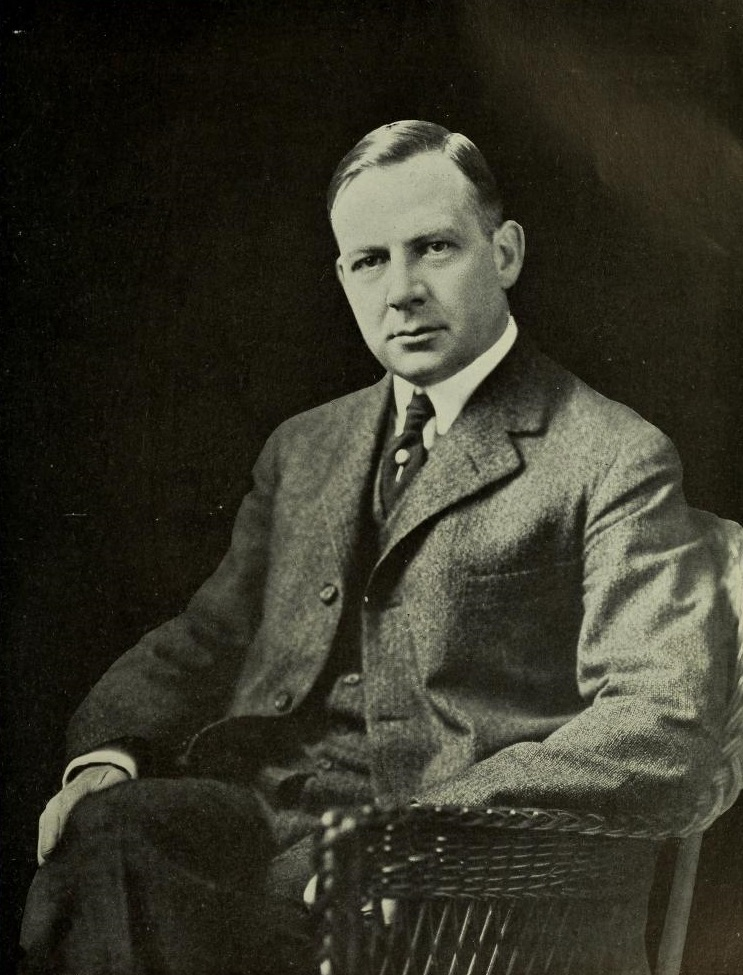
- Portrait of Lotus Coffman

5th President of the University of Minnesota
- In office 1920–1938
- Preceded by: Marion LeRoy Burton
- Succeeded by: Guy Stanton Ford

Personal details
- Born: January 7, 1875 Salem, Indiana
- Died: September 23, 1938 (aged 63) Brooklyn, Iowa
- Spouse: Mary Emma Farrell
- Education: Indiana State University
- Profession: School principal, school district superintendent, professor, and university administrator

Lotus Delta Coffman (January 7, 1875 – September 23, 1938) was the fifth president of the University of Minnesota, serving from 1920 until his death in office on September 22, 1938. Coffman Memorial Union, the main student center, is named in his memory.

== Early life ==
Lotus Delta Coffman, son of Mansford Coffman and Laura Davis, was born January 7, 1875, in Salem, Indiana. Coffman was a graduate of Salem High School in 1892 and a graduate of Indiana Normal School at Terre Haute, in 1896, where he played quarterback on the football team.

He earned an AB degree from Indiana University, 1906; an AM degree there, 1910; a Ph.D. at Columbia, NY, 1911. He later received a LLD from Indiana University and from Carleton College in 1922; a LLD from Columbia University, 1929; a LLD from the University of Michigan, 1931; a LHD from University of Denver, 1930; and a DS degree in education from George Washington University, 1930.

== Career ==
=== Early career ===
Coffman was principal of Salem, Indiana schools from 1900 to 1903; superintendent of Salem schools 1903–1906; superintendent of Connersville School 1906–1908; director of training at Charleston, Illinois Normal School 1908–1912; dean of education at the University of Illinois 1912–1915; Dean of the College of Education at the University of Minnesota 1915–1920; and President of the University of Minnesota 1920–1938.

He was a visiting professor for the Carnegie Endowment for International Peace to New Zealand and Australia 1931; visiting lecturer at the University of the Philippines 1932; member of the National Board of Education to do research in Russia and to visit Poland and Germany; was a consultant to the US Department of Interior on a Land Grant College Survey 1928–1930; and advisor to the Surgeon General on education of disabled soldiers during WWI.

=== Presidency ===
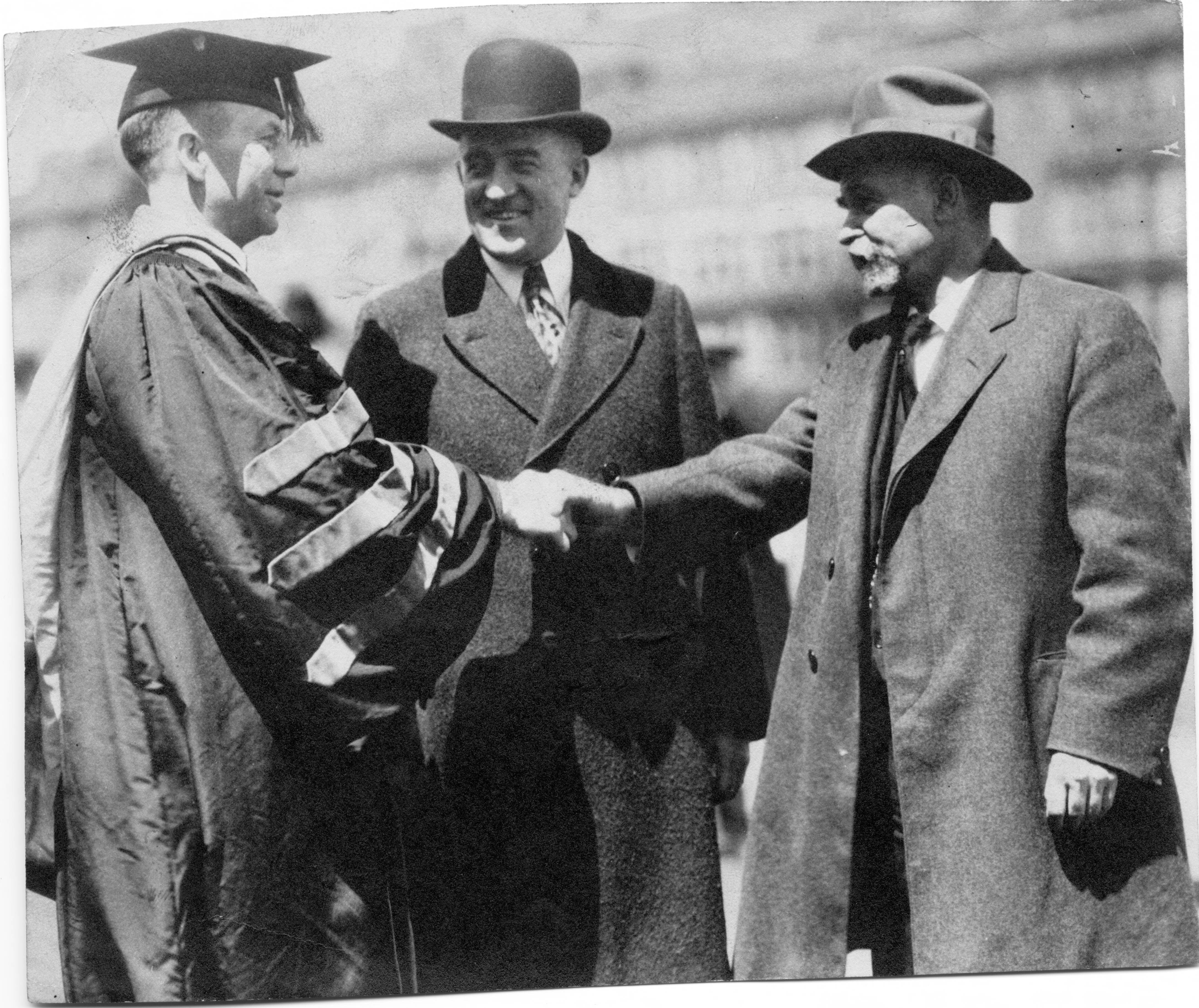
Lotus Coffman, left, is congratulated by Governor J. A. O. Preus, center, and Minneapolis Mayor J. E. Meyers on his inauguration.

Coffman started at the University of Minnesota with a $12,000 annual salary. The university then had 8,200 students on campus. At the time, the university spent $6.5 million annually on the maintenance of the campus. The School of Education enrolled 600 and had 50 faculty members. The Music School building was under construction in 1920. After 10 years as president, the university's property values had increased more than 100%; the budget increased 68%; enrollment increased 60% in undergraduate classes and over 100% in graduate studies; staff increased from 479 to 825 with 25% having the rank of professor—becoming the third largest university in the U.S. During Coffman's time the Memorial Stadium was built, Northrop Auditorium and the Walter Library were added; and the Mayo brothers (Wm J. & Charles H.) gave the university $2 million for endowment of the Mayo Foundation for Graduate Medical Study and Research.

In March 1923, Coffman received a resolution from multiple Presbyterian ministers in Minneapolis, advocating for him to search and remove textbooks with teachings including evolution. This resolution was part of a larger movement on the part of William Bell Riley and the Anti-Evolution League of America to censor education on evolution. In April, the Anti-Evolution League threatened legal action against the university if the four books it named were not removed, although no prosecution was pursued.

Coffman's watch on the university included vigorous surveillance of alleged campus "radicalism," the number of Jewish students admitted to the university, and determined promotion of racial segregation in the university's dormitories. Black students mistakenly placed in university dormitories at admission were forced to leave, often after just one night's residence. Coffman rejected student protests. Despite a student-led substantial report comparing the university's segregated housing with integrated housing at other universities, Coffman insisted that "the races have never lived together nor have they ever sought to live together." Coffman's administrators compiled lists of "radical leaders" and numerical counts of Jewish and Black students who had been admitted to the university, practices that continued throughout Coffman's presidency. University housing was integrated in 1938 only when the historian Guy Stanton Ford succeeded Coffman as president after Coffman's death. Housing segregation was briefly reintroduced when Walter Coffey succeeded Ford as president in 1941, but protests forced Coffey to abandon the attempt.

After a year's leave of absence due to a heart attack at his summer home in Battle Lake, Minnesota, in July 1937, he resumed his job in July 1938.

=== Views on athletics ===
Broadly, Coffman promoted amateur ideals and rules in intercollegiate athletics. He supported the 1929 Carnegie Report, which criticized college football as overemphasized, and agreed with the Big Ten's prohibition of athletic scholarships and post-season bowl games.

== Honors and controversies ==
Opening in 1940, Coffman Memorial Union on the University of Minnesota's Minneapolis campus is named in honor of President Coffman. It was recommended in 2019 that Coffman's name be removed from the student union partly due to his racist policies.

== Personal life ==
He married in Salem on December 28, 1899, to Mary Emma Farrell born September 12, 1877 Paoli, Indiana, daughter of William H.H.P. Farrell & his first wife Mary A. Wible. Coffman died on September 23, 1938.

== See also ==
- List of presidents of the University of Minnesota

Academic offices
Preceded by Marion LeRoy Burton	5th President of the University of Minnesota; 1920 — 1938	Succeeded by Guy Stanton Ford
