= The Gopher Way =

Coordinates: 44°58′23″N 93°14′2″W

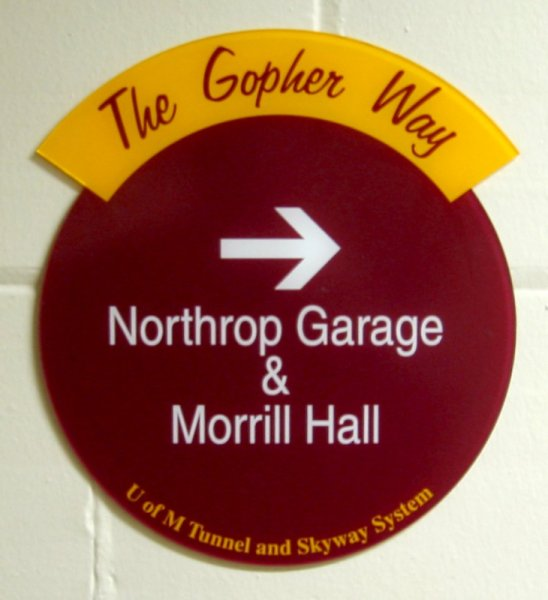
A sign denoting the next stop along the Gopher Way in Johnston Hall.

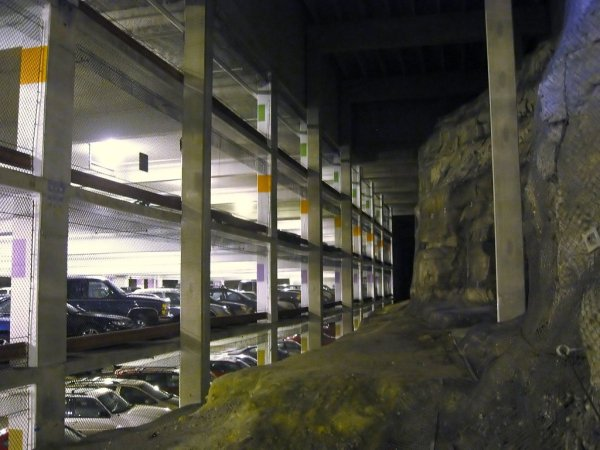
The East River Road Garage is connected to Coffman Memorial Union and the rest of the Health area via the Gopher Way

The Gopher Way is a system of discontinuous tunnels and skyways on the University of Minnesota, Twin Cities campus which connects many buildings. The system is open during the normal business hours of the buildings it occupies, while some portions are open 24 hours a day. Access policies are posted at the entrances of connected buildings. It is one of three skyway/tunnel systems in the Twin Cities area. The other two occupy both downtown Minneapolis and downtown St. Paul.

The system is segmented into eight parts: the West Bank; the Knoll and Mall areas; the Health and Gateway areas; and five smaller segments on the St. Paul campus. Parking structures are also connected to the Gopher Way. It is entirely possible for one to park, attend classes, eat lunch, and drive home without setting foot outdoors, but given the discontinuous nature of it, few people actually do.

The system was first created in the 1920s to connect Nolte Center and Northrop Auditorium in the 1920s, and continued expanding over time. In the 1990s, it gained signs and maps, which can now be found on the official University of Minnesota site.
