= Magnusson Research Farm =

- Research Station
- Location of Magnusson Research Farm Magnusson Research Farm (Minnesota)
- Coordinates: 48°51′48″N 95°51′29″W
- Country: United States
- State: Minnesota
- County: Roseau County
- Town: Roseau

Area
  - Land: 40 acres (16 ha)

The Magnusson Research Farm is a 40-acre research station in Roseau, Minnesota operated by the College of Food, Agriculture, and Natural Resource Sciences of the University of Minnesota. It is the site of perennial crop breeding such as perennial ryegrass (Lolium perenne) and Kernza (Intermediate Wheatgrass). The research station is the northernmost research station for the University of Minnesota. The research station was named after Richard Magnusson, a graduate of the university and a prominent grass seed producer who donated the land for the facility. The farm also conducts tours of its grass seed fields.
