= Rebecca Miriam Cunningham =

American emergency physician and researcher

Rebecca Cunningham
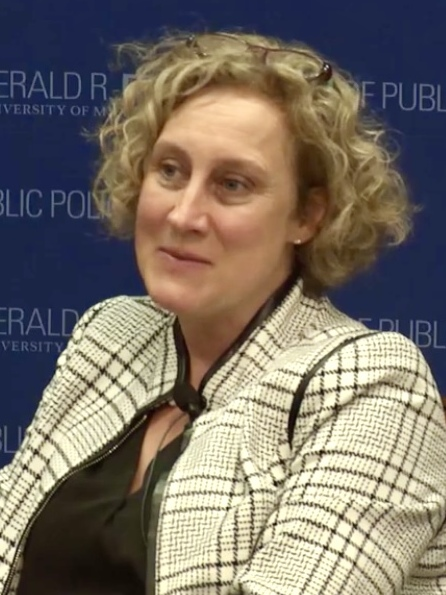
- Cunningham in 2019

18th President of the University of Minnesota
- Incumbent
- Assumed office July 1, 2024
- Preceded by: Jeff Ettinger (interim)

Personal details
- Born: Rebecca Miriam Cunningham; 1970 (age 55–56)
- Children: 3
- Education: Fairfield University (BS); Thomas Jefferson University (MD)

Rebecca Miriam Cunningham (born 1970) is an American emergency physician, researcher, and university administrator. She is the 18th and current president of the University of Minnesota.

She was previously the vice president for research at the University of Michigan, and William G. Barsan Collegiate Professor in the Michigan Medicine Department of Emergency Medicine, and Professor of Health Behavior and Health Education at the School of Public Health.

== Education ==
Cunningham graduated with a Bachelor of Science degree from Fairfield University and received her medical degree from Jefferson Medical College in Philadelphia.

== Career ==
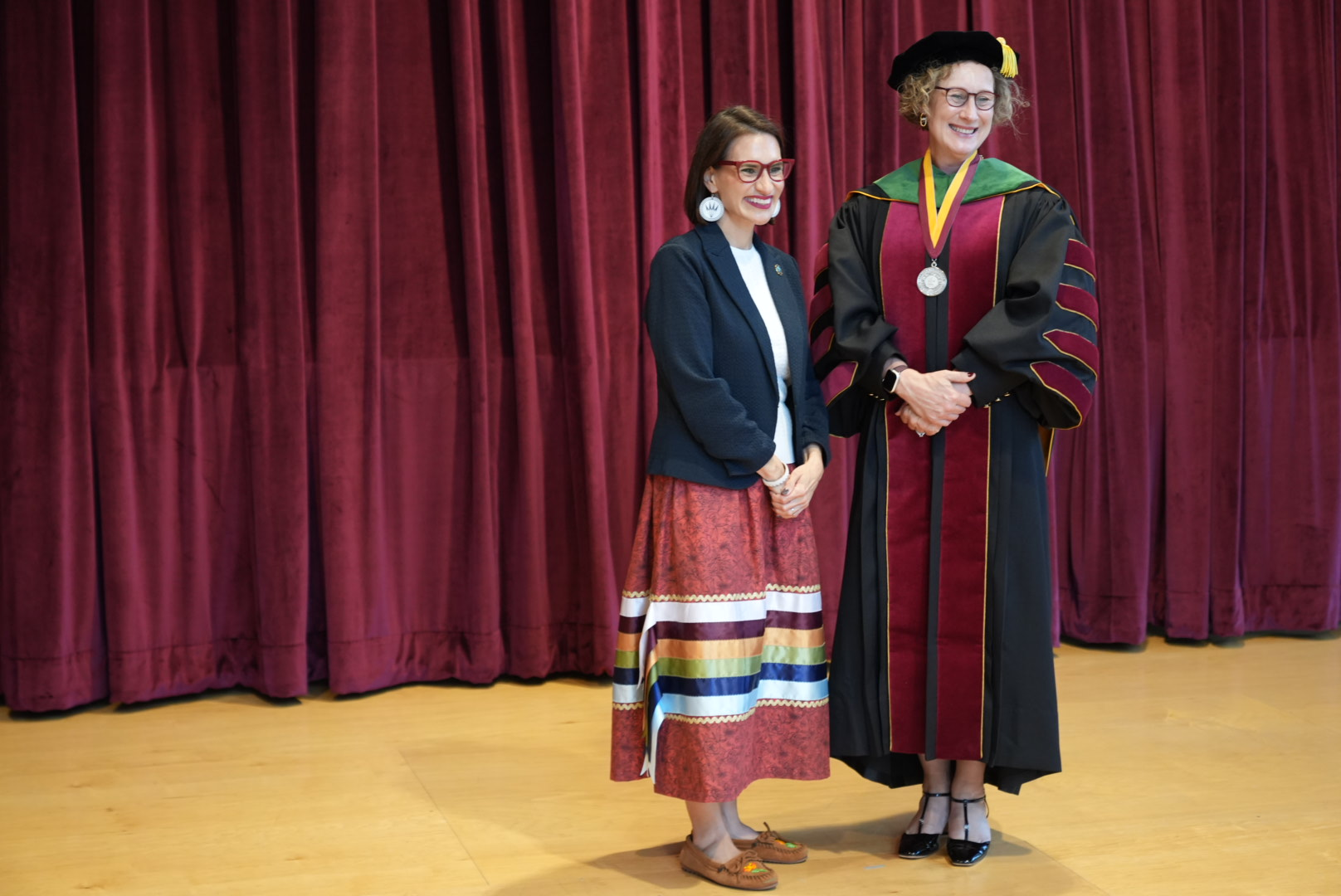
Cunningham and Lieutenant Governor of Minnesota Peggy Flanagan at her presidential inauguration in 2024

Cunningham completed her medical residency in at the University of Michigan. She then joined the faculty at the University of Michigan in 1999.

She later led a NIH-funded national project called "Firearm Safety Among Children and Teens (FACTS)." In 2010, she published "Screening adolescents in the emergency department for weapon carriage," and later "Firearm Violence Among High-risk Emergency Department Youth After an Assault Injury." She also was the inaugural director of the CDC funded U-M Injury Prevention Center.

In 2014, Cunningham was appointed the Associate Chair for Research in the Department of Emergency Medicine. In this role, she collaborated with other researchers and institutions to produce a website that offers free access to data on guns, as well as training for health care providers. A few years later, she was promoted to associate vice president for research-health sciences in the University of Michigan Office of Research for three years.

In 2019, Cunningham was the recipient of the William G. Barsan Collegiate Professorship. She was also elected a member of the National Academy of Medicine and named interim vice president for research. Also in 2019, she received awards for excellence in research from both the Society for Academic Emergency Medicine and the American College of Emergency Physicians.

On February 26, 2024, Cunningham was selected as the 18th President of the University of Minnesota. She succeeded Interim President Jeff Ettinger on July 1, 2024. Official inauguration of Cunningham as President took place September 18, 2024

== See also ==
- List of presidents of the University of Minnesota
