= Guy Stanton Ford =

6th president of the University of Minnesota (1873–1962)

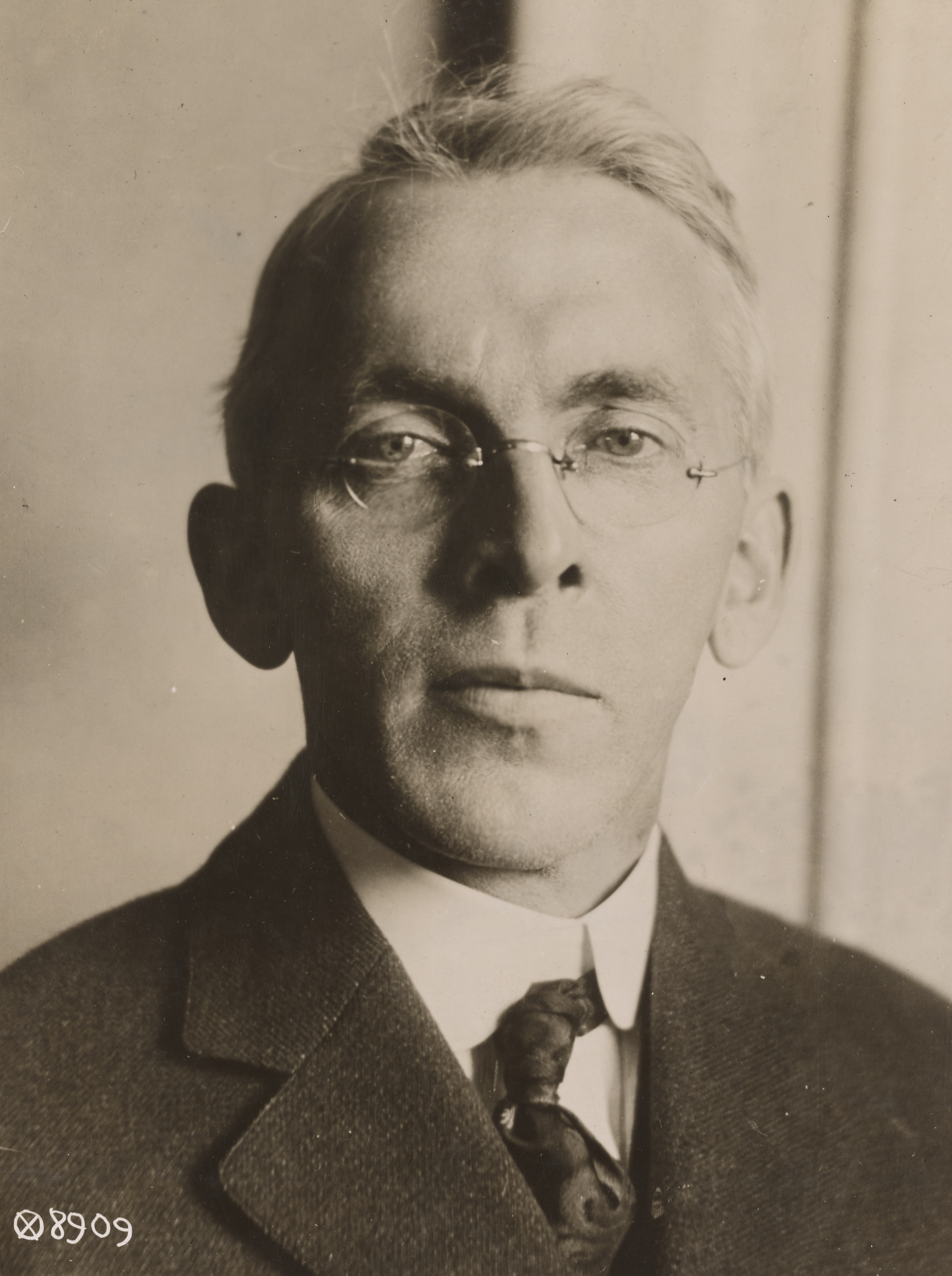

6th President of the University of Minnesota
- In office 1938 – 1941
- Preceded by: Lotus Coffman
- Succeeded by: Walter Coffey

Personal details
- Born: May 9, 1873
- Died: December 29, 1962 (aged 89)
- Profession: University administrator

Guy Stanton Ford (May 9, 1873 – December 29, 1962) was the sixth president of the University of Minnesota. Ford had originally come to the University of Minnesota in 1913, serving as the dean of the Graduate School and as a professor of history. He became president in 1938 after the sudden death of Lotus Coffman. He left the University of Minnesota in November 1941 to become the executive secretary of the American Historical Association in Washington, D.C., and editor of American Historical Review until 1953.

During the First World War, Ford served as the head of the Committee on Public Information's (CPI) division of Civic and Educational Publications. Ford's division oversaw the production of informational bulletins, sample speeches, and other rhetorical aids for use by the CPI's Four Minute Men, a corps of public speakers tasked with addressing audiences around the nation to bolster support for the American war effort. As a historian of European civilization, Ford also directed the publication of histories designed to contrast the positive values of American progressivism against the evils of German Prussianism.

Ford's doctoral thesis (Columbia University, 1903) was entitled Hanover and Prussia, 1795–1803. A Study in Neutrality. Before he went to the University of Minnesota, he was a faculty member of Yale University and the University of Illinois. He was also a member of the Literary Society of Washington and the American Philosophical Society.

The annual Guy Stanton Ford Memorial Lecture is a public lecture by a distinguished scholar in any of many different fields.

== See also ==
- List of presidents of the University of Minnesota

Academic offices
Preceded by Lotus Coffman	6th President of the University of Minnesota; 1938 — 1941	Succeeded by Walter Coffey
