= Marion LeRoy Burton =

American academic administrator (1874–1925)

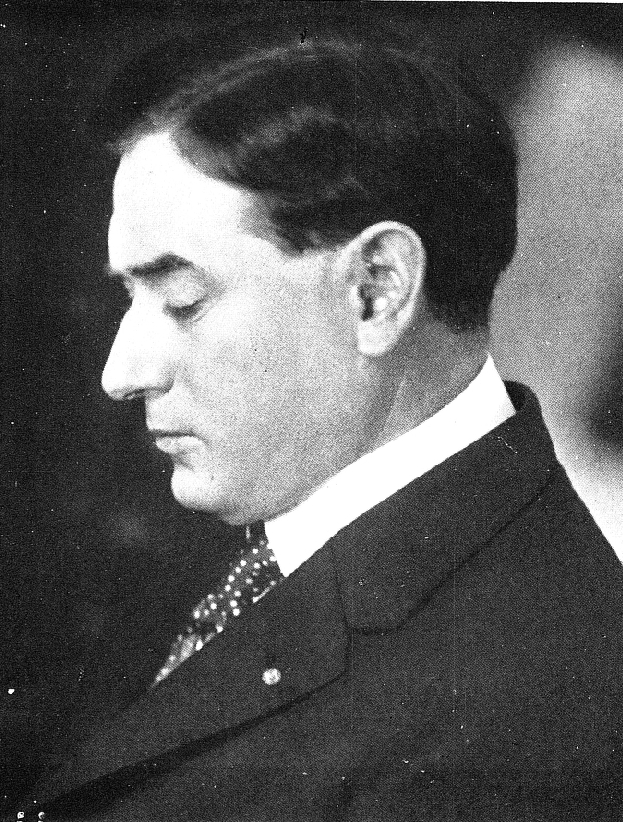

2nd President of Smith College
- In office 1910–1917
- Preceded by: Laurenus Clark Seelye
- Succeeded by: William Allan Neilson

4th President of the University of Minnesota
- In office 1917–1920
- Preceded by: George Edgar Vincent
- Succeeded by: Lotus Coffman

5th President of the University of Michigan
- In office 1920–1925
- Preceded by: Harry Burns Hutchins
- Succeeded by: Alfred Henry Lloyd (acting); C. C. Little

Personal details
- Born: August 30, 1874; Brooklyn, Iowa
- Died: February 18, 1925 (aged 50); Ann Arbor, Michigan

Marion LeRoy Burton (August 30, 1874 – February 18, 1925) was the second president of Smith College, serving from 1910 to 1917. He left Smith to become president of the University of Minnesota from 1917 to 1920. In 1920, he became president of the University of Michigan, where he served until his premature death, aged 50, in 1925 from angina.

== Early life and education ==

Marion LeRoy Burton was born at Brooklyn, Iowa, August 30, 1874, the son of Ira John Henry Burton and Jane Adelize Simmons Burton. As a child, he moved with his parents and his three brothers to Minneapolis. His family was not well-off, and he left school at the end of his first year of high school to work in a drug store. In 1893, he entered Carleton Academy and, after graduating three years later, enrolled in Carleton College in 1896. He worked as an instructor in Latin and Greek during his last year and graduated in June 1900. He immediately married Miss Nina Leona Moses, of Northfield, Minnesota, and began work as principal of Windom Institute in Windom, Minnesota. In 1903, he commenced studies at Yale University, taking a bachelor of divinity degree in 1906 and PhD in 1907, summa cum laude. After a short stint as assistant professor of systematic theology at Yale, he accepted a pulpit at the Church of the Pilgrims in Brooklyn, NY until his election to the presidency of Smith College in 1910.

== Leadership in higher education ==
He served as president of Smith College (1910–1917), the University of Minnesota (1917–1920) and the University of Michigan (1917–1925). His presidency of the University of Minnesota coincided with World War I. As at many other universities, the loyalty of German professors was challenged, and several were dismissed by the Regents during his tenure. He also grappled with the challenge of creating special training for U.S. Army recruits. He was a successful lobbyist, creating a 10-year campus building plan and securing an appropriation of $5,000,000 from the legislature, laying the groundwork for building the central mall on the Twin Cities campus. He left Minnesota before the buildings were completed, and soon commenced a similar effort in Ann Arbor, Michigan.

During his time at Michigan, he oversaw the construction of many buildings, earning him the nickname "Burton the builder." He prepared a detailed building plan and convinced the people of the state and the legislature to grant the university $4,800,000 for the purchase of land and the erection of new buildings and an increased budget of over a million dollars annually. Two years later the legislature of 1923 gave the university over $3,800,000 for buildings and fixed the income of the university from the mill tax at three million dollars per annum. Under his leadership, the university built a new hospital, buildings for the literary college, physics department, engineering laboratories, University High School, and medical school and additions to the dental school and heating plant.

But the legislature was only one source of building funds. The Lawyer's Club was erected with funds given by William W. Cook. William Clements donated funds for the Clements Library. Senator James J. Couzens gave money for the Nurses' Home. Additional funds were raised for the Yost Field House and the Women's League Building. In all, these buildings represented a 69% increase in the size of the physical plant of the university.

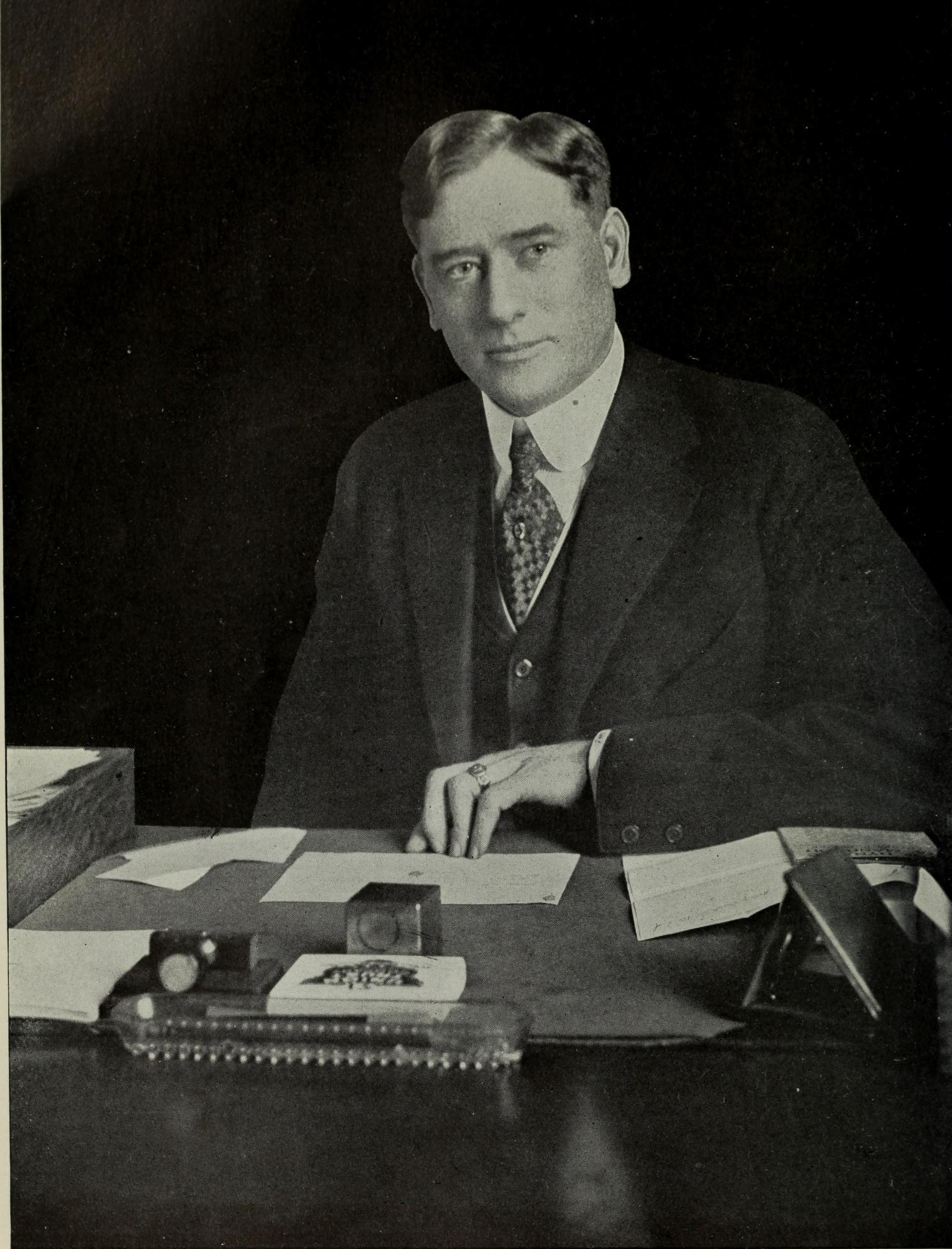
c. 1920

During his presidency, there was substantial conflict about how medicine would be taught and practiced at the university. The legislature cut off funding for a separate homeopathic medical school, which drew the attention of homeopathic doctors in the state and nation and created a storm of protest. Nevertheless, the unit was disbanded in 1921-22. Other disputes centered on whether faculty should be "full-time" or allowed to treat and receive fees from outside patients; the obligation of the hospital to treat indigent patients; the administrative relationship of the Hospital to the Medical School; and the need for a separate Nursing School.

The period 1920-25 saw the establishment of a number of academic units and changes to the curriculum. The School of Education was established by the Board of Regents in May 1921 and a university high school and an elementary school were established in 1922 and 1927 respectively. A growing public awareness of the desirability of teaching health and hygiene in the public schools led to the development of the Department of Physical Education in the School of Education. In 1923-24, Dr. Margaret Bell became Associate Professor of Women's Physical Education. The university organized a Division of Hygiene and Public Health in 1921. In the beginning this encompassed work in public health, physical education, intramural sports, and was closely related to the University Health Service. Eventually, these areas were divided into separate units.

A curriculum in social work was commenced in May 1921. The Department of Industrial Research became the Department of Engineering Research in October 1920 and included the Industrial Research Laboratory, which undertook research projects for Michigan's growing manufacturing industries.

While at Smith College, Burton had formed a close personal friendship with Calvin Coolidge and was invited to make the speech nominating him for president at the Republican National Convention in June in Cleveland, Ohio in 1924. While the president of the University of Michigan, he invited Robert Frost to be a Poet-in-Residence.

== Honors and memorials ==
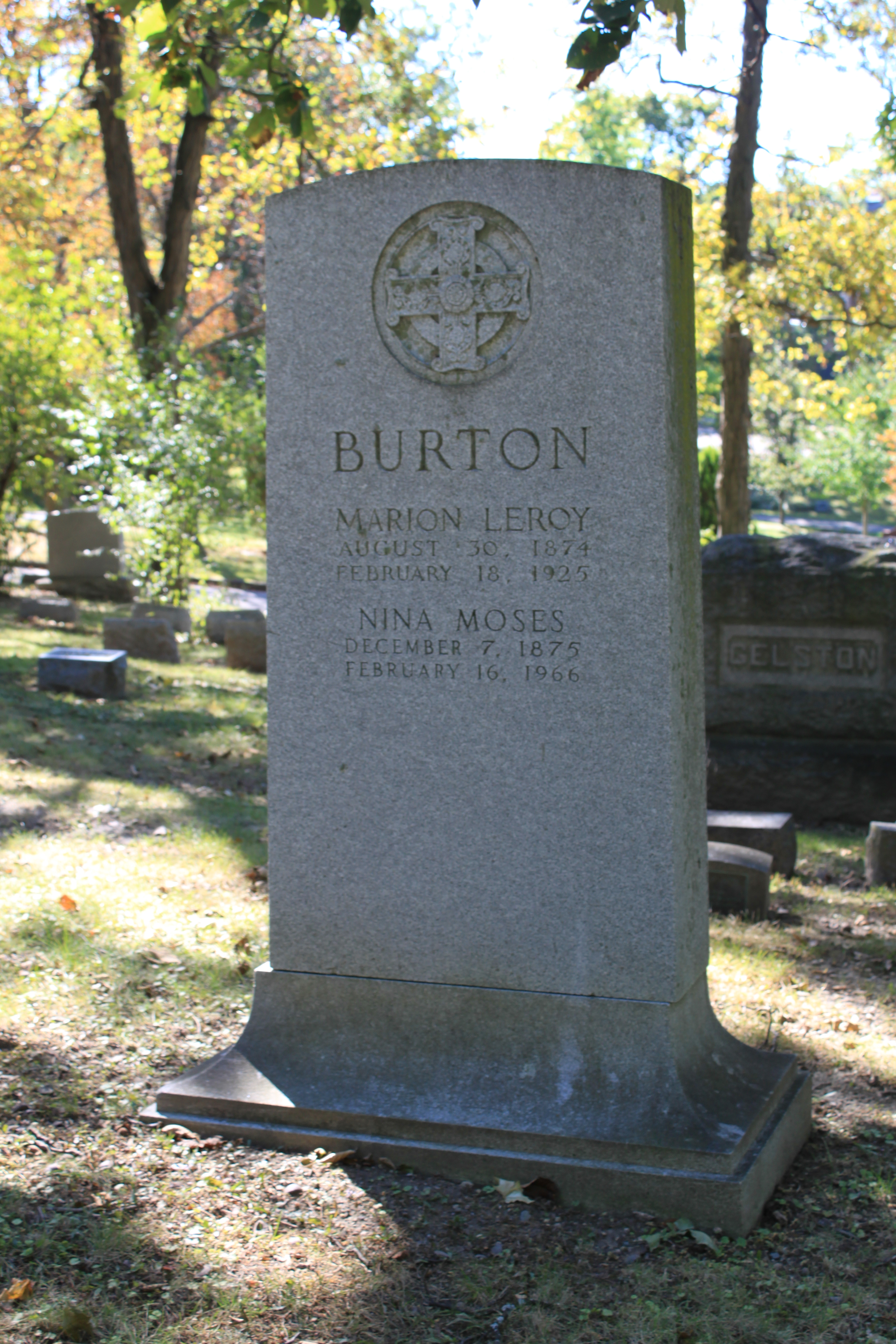
Burton grave, Forest Hill Cemetery

He received several honorary degrees: a doctorate of divinity from Carleton College in 1909, a doctor of laws from Tufts College in 1911, from Western Reserve University in 1911, Amherst College in 1913, Hobart College in 1913 and the University of Michigan in 1920.

In addition to the Burton Memorial Tower on the University of Michigan campus, Burton Hall at the University of Minnesota, and Burton Hall at Smith College, there is a school, Marion L. Burton Elementary School, named after him in Huntington Woods, Michigan.

== Publications of Marion LeRoy Burton ==
- "The Problem of Evil," 1909
- "The Secret of Achievement," 1913
- "Our Intellectual Attitude in an Age of Criticism," 1913
- "Life which is Life Indeed," 1914
- "First Things," 1915
- "On Being Divine," 1916

== See also ==
- List of presidents of the University of Minnesota

Academic offices
Preceded by Laurenus Clark Seelye	President of Smith College; 1910–1917	Succeeded by William Allan Neilson
Preceded by George Vincent	4th President of the University of Minnesota; 1917–1920	Succeeded by Lotus Coffman
Preceded by Harry Burns Hutchins	5th President of the University of Michigan; 1920–1925	Succeeded by Alfred Henry Lloyd (interim); Clarence Cook Little
