= Malcolm Moos =

American political scientist (1916–1982)

10th President of the University of Minnesota
- In office 1967–1974
- Preceded by: O. Meredith Wilson
- Succeeded by: C. Peter Magrath

Personal details
- Born: April 19, 1916 Saint Paul, Minnesota
- Died: January 28, 1982 (aged 65) Ten Mile Lake, Minnesota

Malcolm Charles Moos (April 19, 1916 – January 28, 1982) was an American political scientist, speechwriter, and academic administrator. He was a professor of political science at Johns Hopkins University for two decades. As a speechwriter, Moos wrote President Dwight Eisenhower's final warning about the influence of the military-industrial complex in 1961. Moos then served as the president of the University of Minnesota from 1967 to 1974.

== Early life ==
Moos was born on April 19, 1916, in Saint Paul, Minnesota. He received his bachelor's and master's degrees in political science from the University of Minnesota. He received his doctorate, also in political science, from the University of California at Berkeley.

== Career ==
Moos first taught at the University of Minnesota. He was a fellow at the University of California and a research assistant at the University of Alabama. He taught at the University of Wyoming in 1942, then at Johns Hopkins University for 21 years. He was also an associate editor of the Baltimore Evening Sun.

Moos joined President Eisenhower's staff as a special assistant in 1957 and became his chief speechwriter in 1958. Among the many speeches Moos wrote for Eisenhower was Eisenhower's 1961 valedictory speech, which warned of the influence of the military-industrial complex.

Moos taught political science at Columbia University for three years and worked for the Rockefeller family for two years. He was director of policy and planning at the Ford Foundation from 1964 to 1967.

Moos served as the president of the University of Minnesota from 1967 to 1974. In 1967, he became the first native Minnesotan and alumnus to serve as a University of Minnesota president. During his tenure, Moos faced the rise of civil rights and anti-war protests.

In 1974, Moos was appointed executive director of the Center for the Study of Democratic Institutions in Santa Barbara, California. In 1978, he ran for the United States Senate as a Republican but failed to win the nomination.

== Personal life and death ==
Moos married Margaret Tracy Gager, and he had five children. He died in his sleep at his home in northern Minnesota in 1982. He was said to have had a heart condition.

== See also ==
- List of presidents of the University of Minnesota

Academic offices
Preceded by O. Meredith Wilson	10th President of the University of Minnesota; 1967 – 1974	Succeeded by C. Peter Magrath
