= James Morrill =

American academic (1891–1979)

- Morrill in 1949

8th President of the University of Minnesota
- In office 1945–1960
- Preceded by: Walter Coffey
- Succeeded by: O. Meredith Wilson

Personal details
- Born: September 24, 1891
- Died: July 1979 (aged 87)
- Education: Ohio State University

James Lewis Morrill (September 24, 1891 – July 1979) was a professor and academic administrator who served as the president of the University of Wyoming and the University of Minnesota. He attended Ohio State University for his undergraduate education and, after a brief career as a journalist, he returned there for a career in teaching and administration. In 1942 he left to accept the position of president at the University of Wyoming. After only three years he was recruited to become the eighth president of the University of Minnesota. During his time at the University of Minnesota he oversaw a period of immense growth; enrollment at the school more than doubled in a single year due in large part to returning servicemen using the G.I. Bill to pursue a college education. Morrill put forward a plan to expand the campus across the Mississippi River to ensure the university would have room to accommodate the coming generation of baby boomers. After retiring in 1960 he moved to Ohio. He died in 1979.

== View on Intercollegiate Athletics ==
When Morrill was a vice president at Ohio State he was closely involved in the financing for the construction of Ohio Stadium. But by the time Morrill became president at Minnesota he was convinced college football had become too professional and actively worked to keep Minnesota and the Big Ten Conference from professionalizing further. Under his leadership, Minnesota was the only school to vote against the 3 most important Big Ten votes in the immediate post-World War II years: the 1946 and 1950 Rose Bowl Game agreements, and the 1949 legalization of the athletic scholarship.

== See also ==
- List of presidents of the University of Minnesota

Academic offices
Preceded by Walter Coffey	8th President of the University of Minnesota; 1945 — 1960	Succeeded by O. Meredith Wilson
