= O. Meredith Wilson =

Historian and academic administrator (1909–1998)

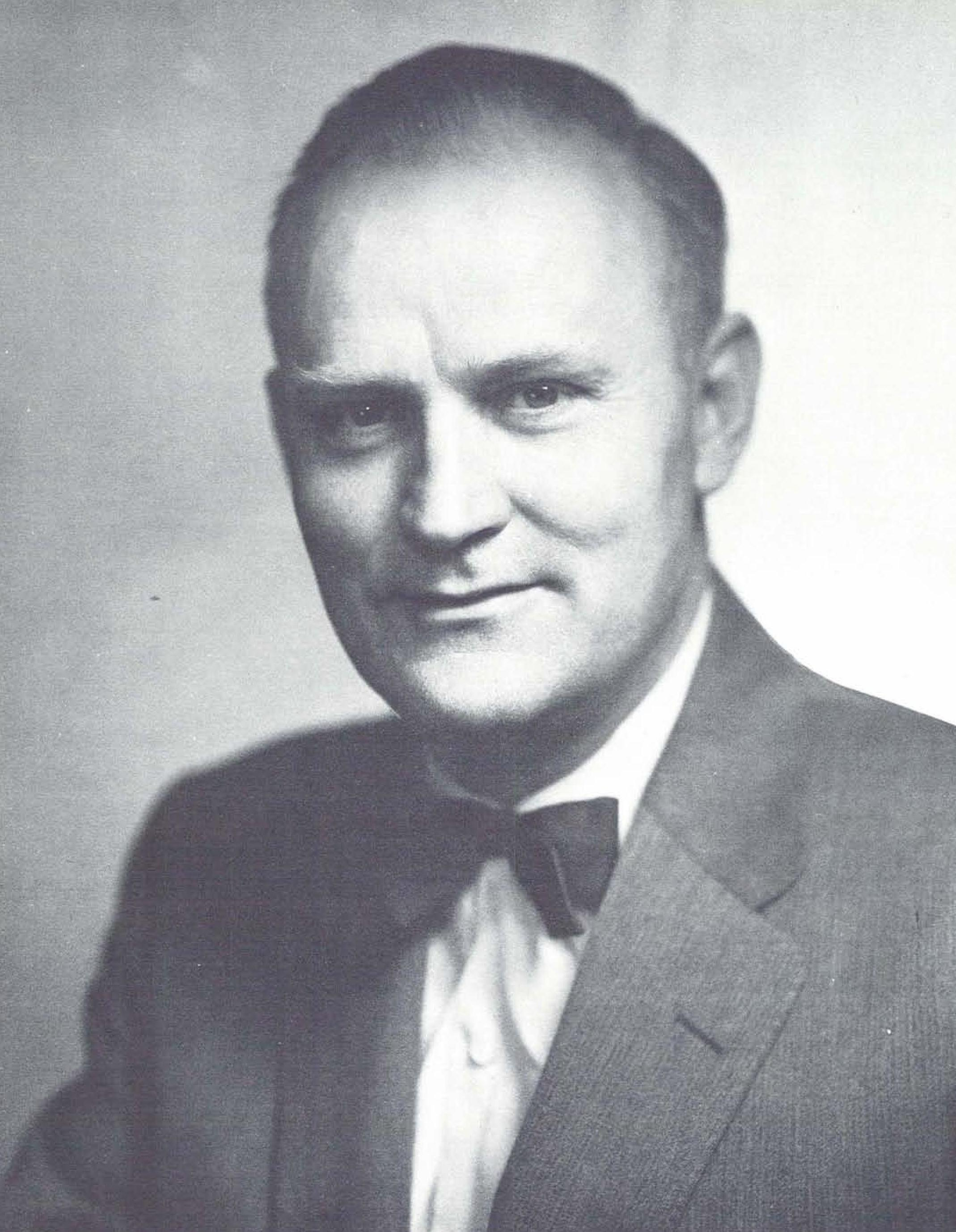
- Wilson in 1957

9th President of the University of Minnesota
- In office 1960–1967
- Preceded by: James Morrill
- Succeeded by: Malcolm Moos

9th President of the University of Oregon
- In office 1954–1960

Personal details
- Born: September 21, 1909 Colonia Juárez, Chihuahua, Mexico
- Died: November 7, 1998 (aged 89) Eugene, Oregon, U.S.
- Profession: Historian and university administrator

Owen Meredith Wilson (September 21, 1909 – November 7, 1998) was an American historian and academic administrator. He served as president of the University of Oregon from 1954 to 1960 and as president of the University of Minnesota from 1960 to 1967.

The son of Guy C. Wilson and Melissa Stevens, Wilson was born in the Mexican Mormon colony of Colonia Juárez, Chihuahua, in 1909. His family was displaced by the Mexican Revolution a few years later and moved to a ranch near the Rio Grande. Wilson attended the University of Utah and Brigham Young University. He received a doctorate from the University of California, Berkeley, in 1943. He taught at the University of Chicago and the University of Utah and researched colonial and revolutionary American history.

Wilson became the ninth president of the University of Oregon in 1954. He was credited with intensifying tenure requirements and creating the Institute of Molecular Biology. In 1960, he left Oregon to become the ninth president of the University of Minnesota. Wilson presided over much of the construction of the West Bank campus, though it had been planned previously. Wilson amended the plans, however, to include a major research library on the West Bank, which now is named in his honor. Wilson left the University of Minnesota in 1967 to become director of the Center for Advanced Study in the Behavioral Sciences, at Stanford University.

Wilson worked as chair of the American Council on Education and headed of the board of Federal Reserve Bank of San Francisco. Wilson was awarded honorary degrees by Reed College, Lewis and Clark College, Carleton College, Macalester College, University of Utah, University of North Dakota, and University of Notre Dame.

Wilson died from brain cancer at his Eugene, Oregon home in 1998, seven weeks past his 89th birthday.

== See also ==
- List of presidents of the University of Minnesota

Academic offices
Preceded by James Morrill	9th President of the University of Minnesota; 1960 — 1967	Succeeded by Malcolm Moos
