= Ten Mile Lake (Cass County, Minnesota) =

Lake in the state of Minnesota, United States

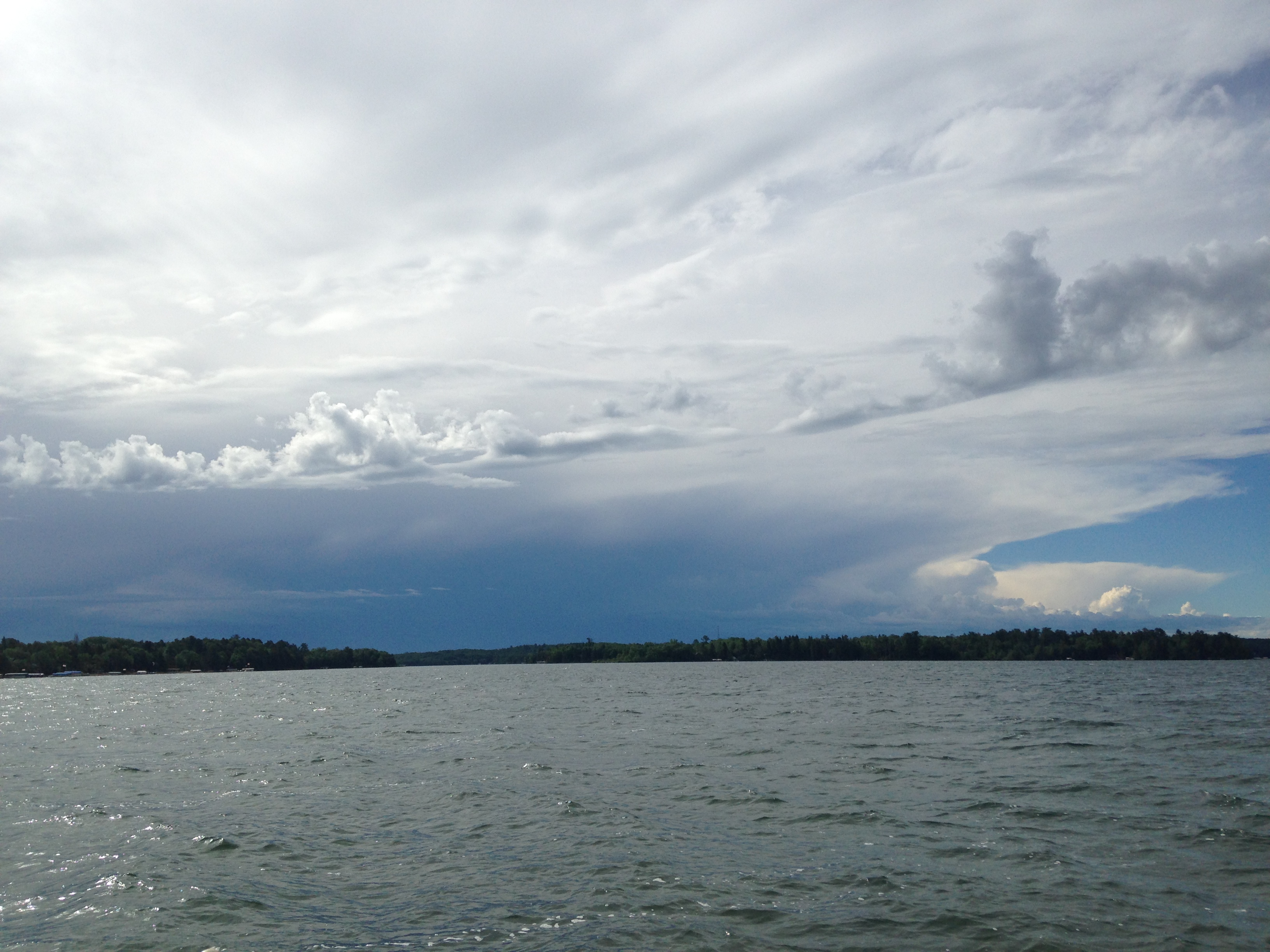

- Location within Minnesota Location within the United States
- Location: Cass County, Minnesota, United States
- Coordinates: 46.97°N 94.58°W
- Basin countries: United States
- Surface area: 5,046.68 acres (2,042.32 ha)
- Max. depth: 208 ft (63 m)
- Water volume: 260,892 acre⋅ft (321,806,000 m^{3})
- Shore length^{1}: 24.83 mi (39.96 km)
- ^{1} Shore length is not a well-defined measure.

Ten Mile Lake is a lake located in north central Minnesota, United States. It is directly south of Walker and northwest of Hackensack. It is spring fed and is the deepest natural lake enclosed in Minnesota's borders. Ten Mile Lake covers over 5,046 acres (20.42 km^{2}) with a maximum depth of 208 feet (63 m). It is known for its especially clear and clean water, due to the fresh spring sources. It is one of 25 Sentinel lakes monitored by the Minnesota DNR due to being a deep mesotrophic lake in the center of the state.

Ten Mile Lake was named for its distance, 10 miles (16 km) from the Indian agency on the Leech Lake Indian Reservation.

Neighboring lakes include Portage Lake to the north, and Birch Lake to the south. Ten Mile Lake is also the headwaters of the Boy River, which flows downstream through Boy Lake, Woman Lake, and eventually into the Leech Lake River and finally the Mississippi River. This is a popular canoe and kayak route, since there are not many portages, and it can be done in just a few days.

Most of the property around Ten Mile Lake is owned privately, but several resorts offer visitors a place to stay for short vacations.

== Invasive Species ==
Despite efforts to prevent the spread of invasive species from other freshwater bodies in the Great Lakes area, zebra mussel larvae were found in Ten Mile Lake in October 2019.

Residents are also taking precautions to prevent the spread of spiny waterflea to Ten Mile Lake, which have affected the ecosystems of other freshwater bodies in the Great Lakes area.

== See also ==
- List of lakes in Minnesota
