= Coffman Memorial Union =

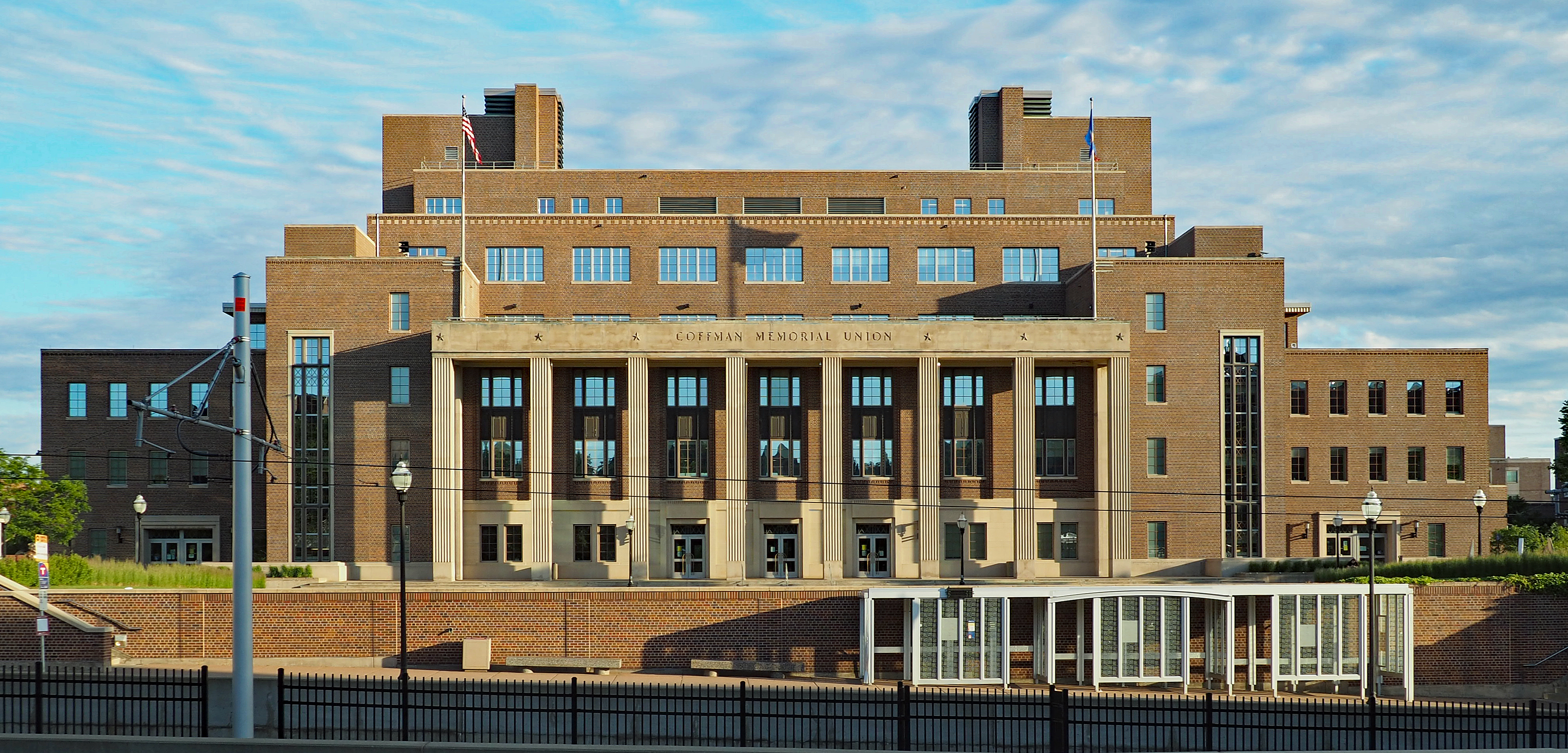
- Coffman Memorial Union in 2020, viewed from the north

General information
- Type: Student union
- Architectural style: Stripped Classical (exterior); Streamline Moderne (interior)
- Location: Northrop Mall, University of Minnesota, 300 Washington Avenue SE; Minneapolis, MN 55455
- Coordinates: 44°58′22″N 93°14′07″W
- Named for: Lotus Coffman
- Groundbreaking: 1939
- Opened: 1940
- Renovated: 1974-1976; 1999-2003
- Owner: Board of Regents of the University of Minnesota
- Operator: University of Minnesota Student Unions & Activities

Technical details
- Floor count: 7
- Floor area: 336,000 square feet
- Lifts/elevators: 7

Design and construction
- Architects: Clarence H. Johnston, Jr.

Renovating team
- Architect: Ellerbe Becket (2003)

Website
- http://www.coffman.umn.edu

Coffman Memorial Union (abbreviated CMU, and commonly known as Coffman Union or simply Coffman) is a student union on the East Bank campus of the University of Minnesota in Minneapolis. Situated near the Mississippi River, Coffman anchors the south end of Northrop Mall, a grassy area at the center of campus that is bordered by the University's physics, mathematics, chemistry, and administration buildings, plus Walter Library and Northrop Auditorium. Coffman sits at the south end of the mall, across Washington Avenue, and opposite Northrop.

== History ==
Coffman Memorial Union was built between 1939 and 1940 as a new "center of social life" for the University of Minnesota campus, a role that had previously been filled by Shevlin Hall and Nicholson Hall in the Old Campus Historic District, for the women's and men's student unions, respectively. Designed by architect Clarence H. Johnston Jr, the new building opened in September 1940 and was dedicated on October 25 of the same year. It was named in memory of Lotus D. Coffman, President of the University of Minnesota between 1920 and 1938, who first imagined the campus having one, united student union. Although the new building separated the men's and women's lounges, most of the other spaces inside were open to both, equally. It was built to accommodate 14,000 students.

By 1965, Coffman was the most used building on campus. The furniture began to show wear and tear, due to its excessive use over the years and 20,000 students utilizing Coffman on any given day. That same year, students began staging protests in the building in response to the United States' involvement in the Vietnam War. On May 4, 1970, the same day as the Kent State shootings, protesters started occupying Coffman 24 hours a day which lasted for a month. In May 1972, the largest demonstrations at the university took place in response to President Richard Nixon's announcement that the United States would begin to blockade and mine North Vietnam's harbors. On May 10, over 6,000 protesters gathered at Coffman for a rally that included former United States Congressman Eugene McCarthy.

From 1974 to 1976, the building underwent a renovation that became widely criticized for its adverse effect on the building's exterior. Much of the original Streamline Moderne aspects were eliminated; a third of the back terrace was enclosed by angled glass; the main lounge was reduced from two stories to one, in order to provide space for student organizations; the game and billiards lounge relocated to the basement, later becoming known as "Goldy's Gameroom", while a theater/lecture hall was built in its place; and the doors between the front pillars were replaced with large, deep-cut apron windows containing angular green-house styled roofs, requiring students to use the side doors to enter the building. Additionally, the color scheme was changed to bright magenta, blue, yellow, orange, purple, and green. The new angled glass extended floor space in the Main Lounge, which was renamed the Ski-U-Mah lounge, but was found to trap heat during the summer and not retain any during the winter. Minnesota Daily cartoonist Steve Sack referred to the building as the "Coffman Memorial Microwave Oven" and stated, "the windows of dear Coffman were designed most of all, to waste energy during the winter and deep-fry us spring and fall". While the renovation added 25,000 feet of space overall and raised the number of students it could accommodate to 42,000, its design made it harder for large groups to assemble in the building, as a direct response to the protests. The renovation was considered "an architectural crime" by critics led by University Librarian Herbert Scherer.

Throughout the 1980s, Coffman became well known as a place to watch television and catch up on the news. The building's tv brought students together during difficult times, such as during the Space Shuttle Challenger's launch and subsequent explosion. In the 1990s, several groups were given space within Coffman: the African, Asian-American, Mi Gente (formerly known as La Raza), Disabled Student, and Queer Students cultural centers.

In 1999, the building began preparing for a second significant renovation. In 2001, the Board of Regents approved the $71.5 million budget and construction began the following month, lasting until 2003. Almost all traces of the 1976 renovation were removed, and the building's exterior was restored to its original appearance. While the interior's old terrazzo floors and light fixtures were brought back, it was also modernized, such as with the addition of air conditioning. The lower floors were greatly expanded to include the main University of Minnesota Bookstore, food vendors, offices, lounges, and the glass "Cube" which sits adjacent to Washington Avenue. Additionally, a new 1,900-car parking garage opened behind the building, with 400 short term parking spaces. When the building reopened, the Al-Madinah and American Indian cultural centers were also given space inside.

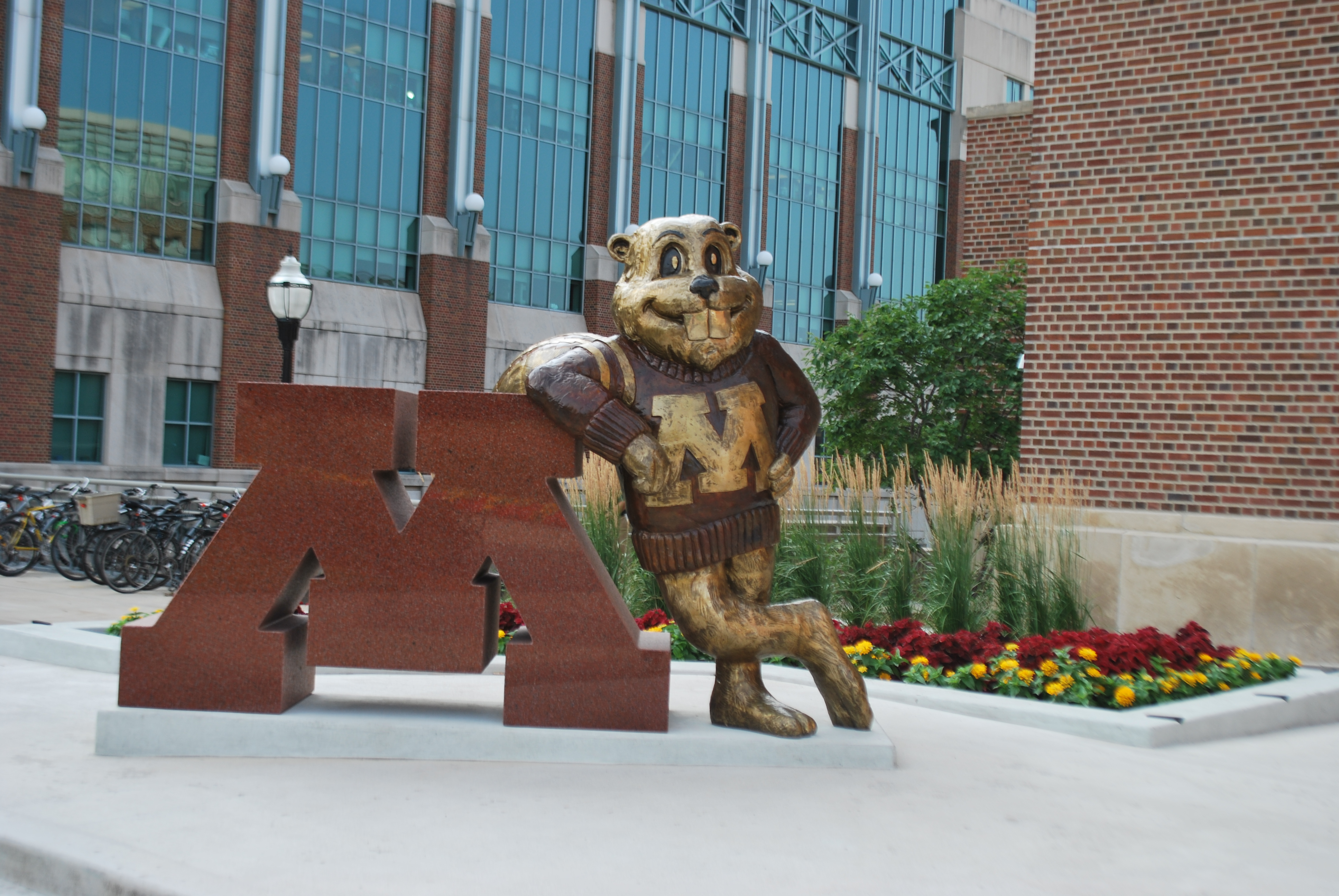
The statue of Goldy Gopher that was unveiled in 2013.

In 2013, the second floor was renovated. The new design features the cultural centers' spaces surrounding an open section in the middle. It also includes conference rooms and several more open areas for students to utilize. That same year, a large statue of the university's mascot, Goldy Gopher, was unveiled in front of Coffman, which has since become a popular spot for students to take pictures.

On January 19, 2018, Coffman, along with the buildings lining Northrop Mall and a few in the surrounding area, was listed on the National Register of Historic Places as part of the Northrop Mall Historic District.

In 2019, after 16 months of study, a university task force recommended removing Lotus Coffman's name from the building due to his racist and anti-Semitic policies.

According to the December 2021 update to the Twin Cities Campus Plan, approved by the Board of Regents, Coffman is set to receive a third major renovation to meet the current needs of the student population. The building's overall architecture and integrity is to be untouched, while at the same time a more welcoming space for the many diverse uses the building has is meant to be created. Some recommended changes and additions include constructing an accessibility ramp on the building's east side in order to provide easier access from the front lawn to Delaware street, which runs behind the building; and connecting the bookstore directly to the transit stop on Washington Avenue, which also includes building a new transit lounge, waiting area, and amenity space.

== Services and amenities ==
The building hosts a variety of services including the University of Minnesota Bookstore, Minnesota Marketplace Food Court, US Postal Service, IT Student Lab, administration services, and student group services. While the main lounge and theater are located on the main floor of the building, the lower level offers access to the bookstore, Great Hall, and several dining options. The basement features the Whole Music Club and an entertainment center called Goldy's Gameroom, featuring more food options, a bowling alley, foosball, billiard tables, and study spots for current students. The building's upper floors are largely reserved for student and administration use, with student groups occupying much of the second floor. The fourth floor is home to the Campus Club, a member-based dining and event venue primarily used by faculty and alumni.

== Organizations ==
The building is home to the University of Minnesota Student Unions & Activities office, the Minnesota Student Association (the undergraduate student government organization), and the Graduate and Professional Student Assembly (the graduate student government organization). Other student groups located within the building include:

- Al-Madinah Cultural Center
- American Indian Student Cultural Center
- Asian-American Student Union
- Black Student Union
- Commuter Connection
- Disabled Student Cultural Center
- Mi Gente Latinx Student Cultural Center
- Minnesota International Student Association
- Queer Student Cultural Center

== Gallery ==
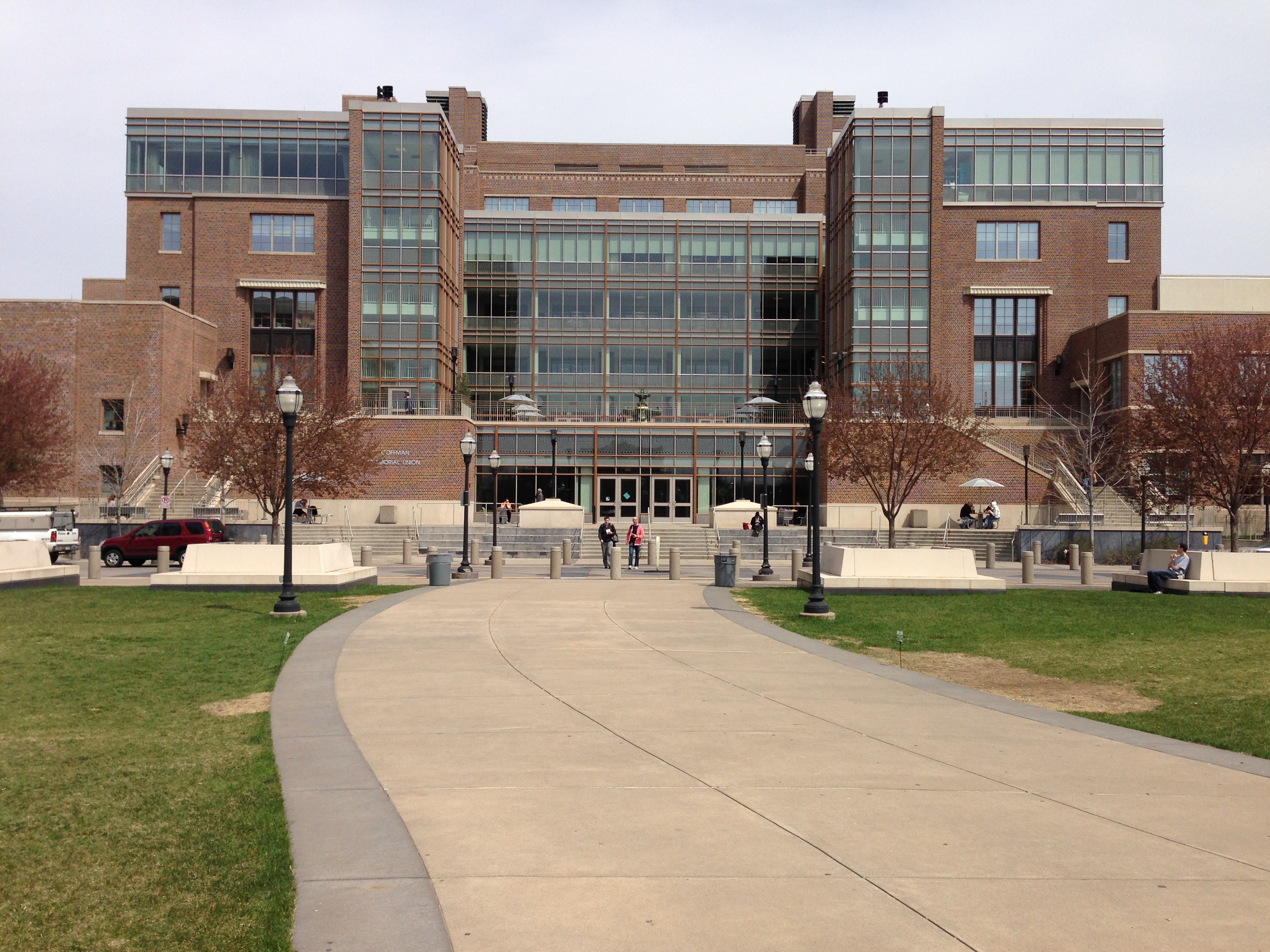
South facade as viewed from Yudof Plaza

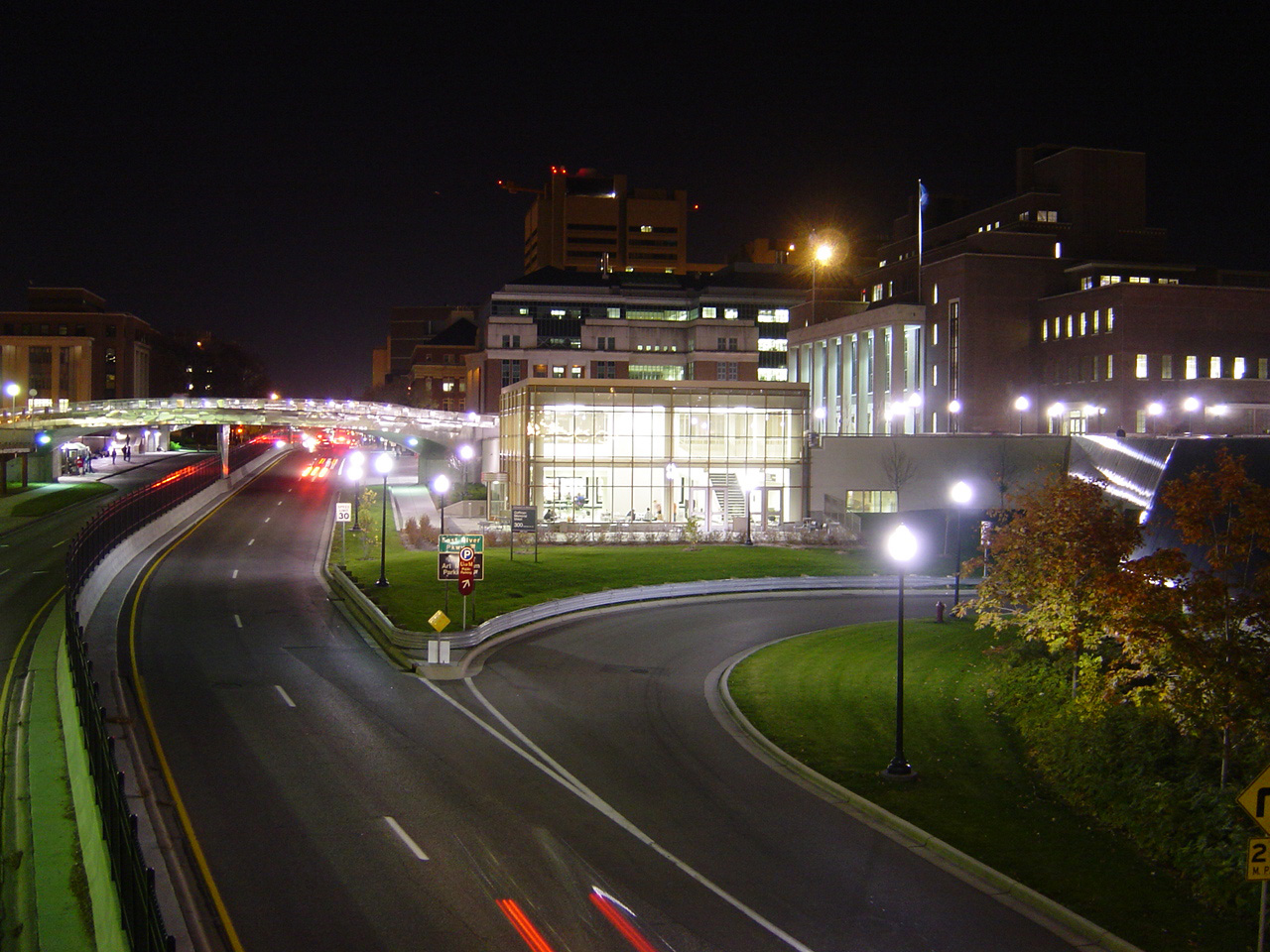
CMU at night, with the "Cube" in foreground

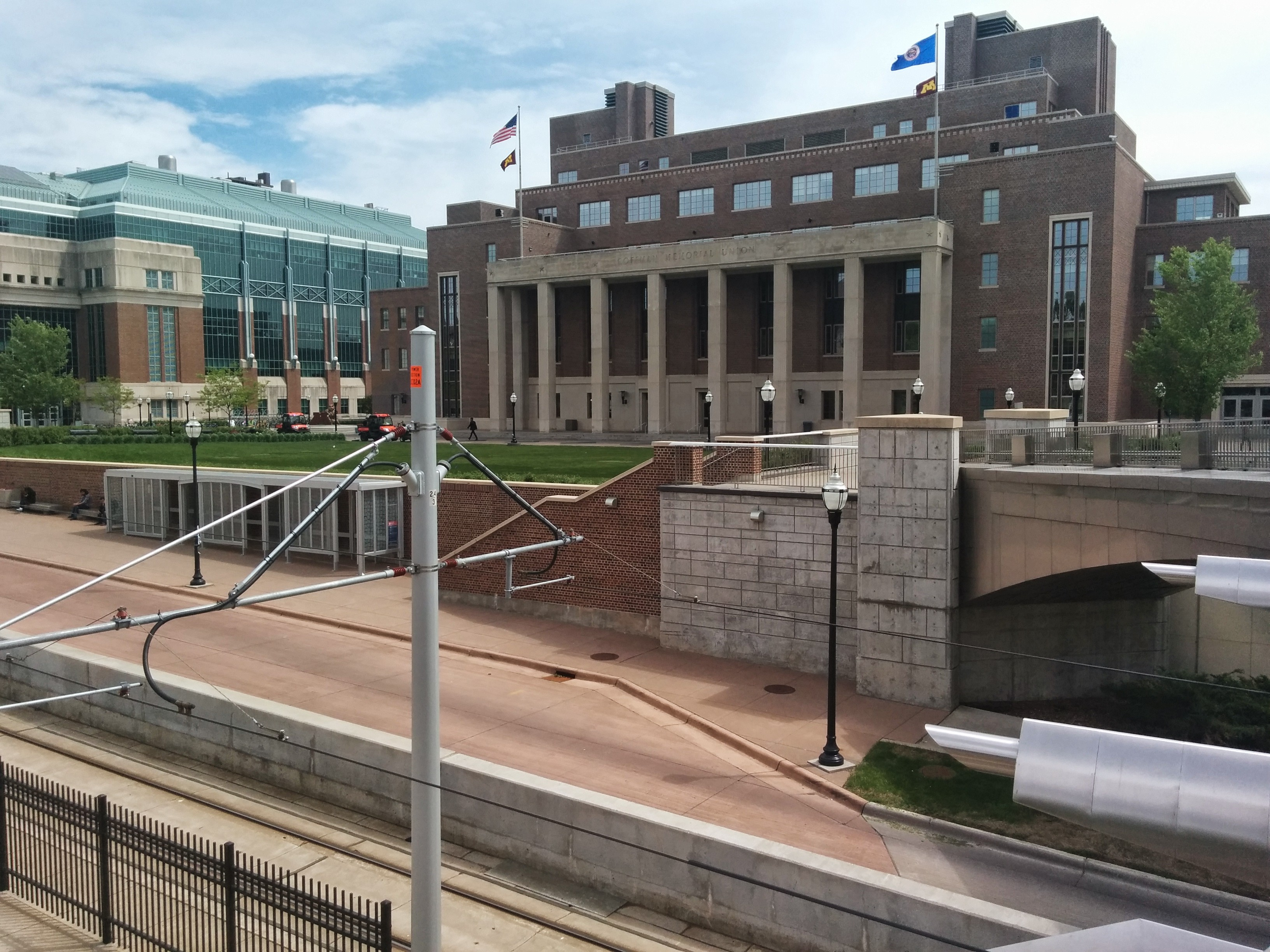
Coffman from a nearby pedestrian bridge above Washington Avenue

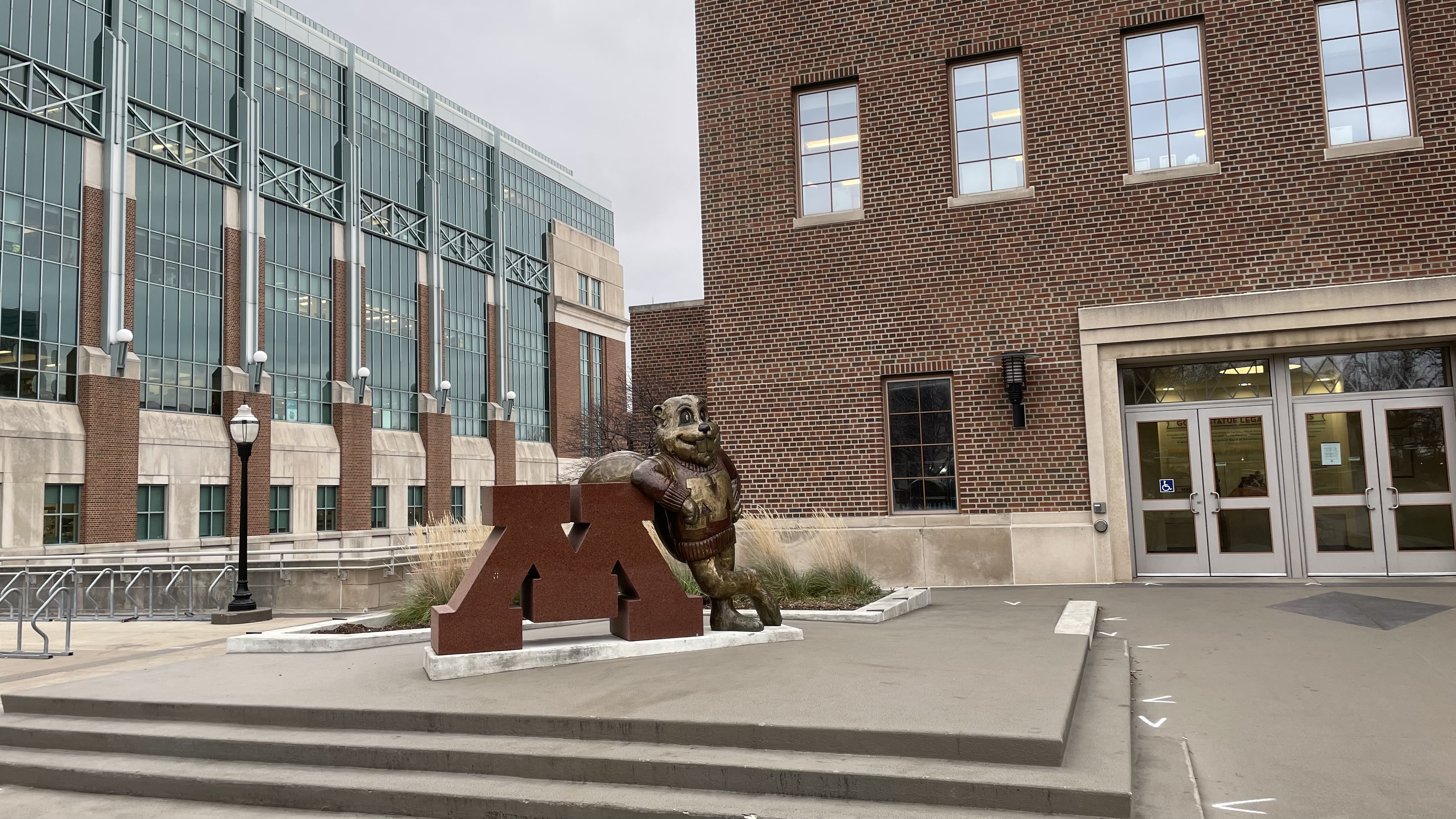
The Goldy Gopher statue located in front of Coffman

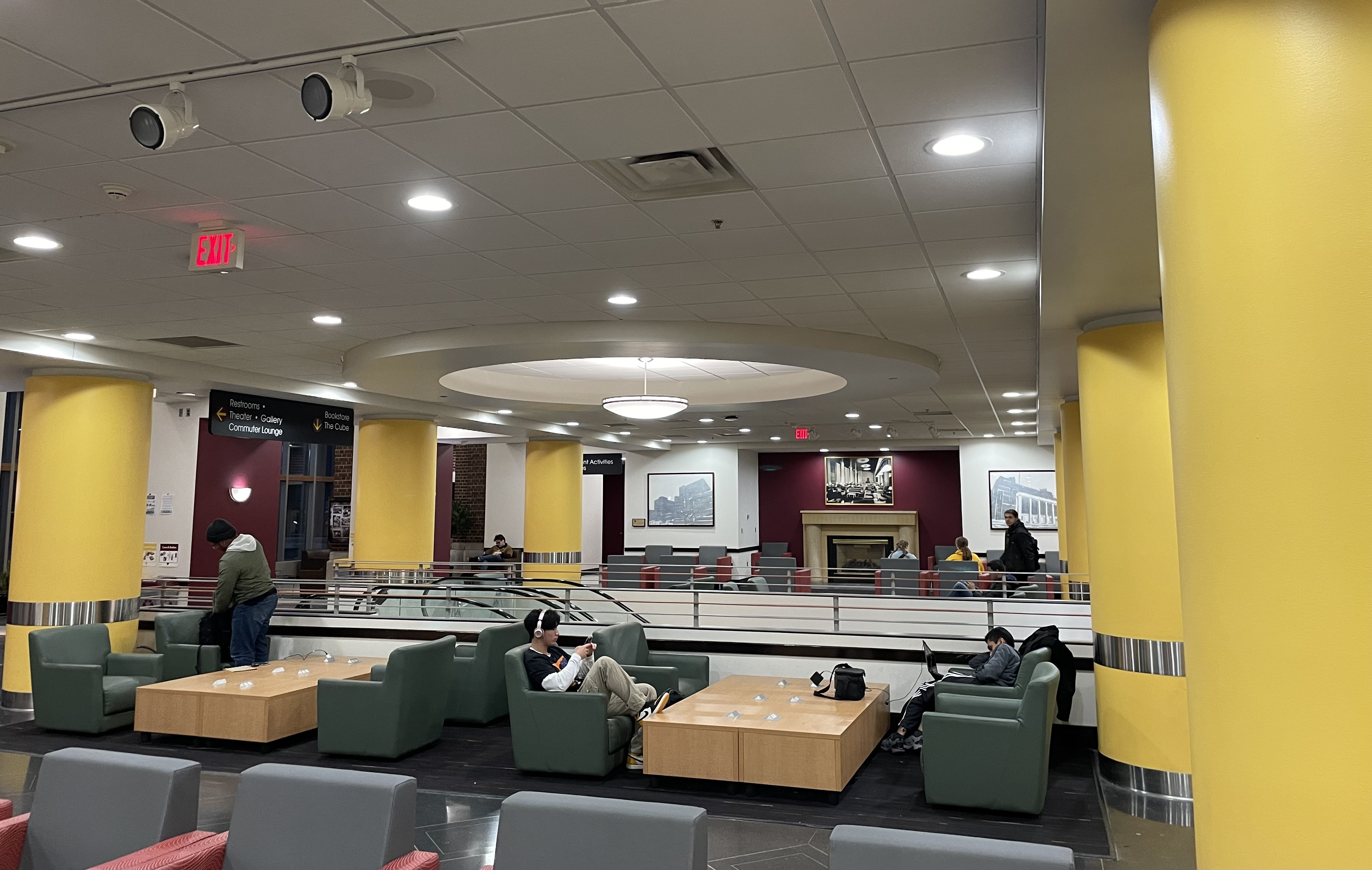
Coffman's fireplace lounges, formerly the Ski-U-Mah lounge

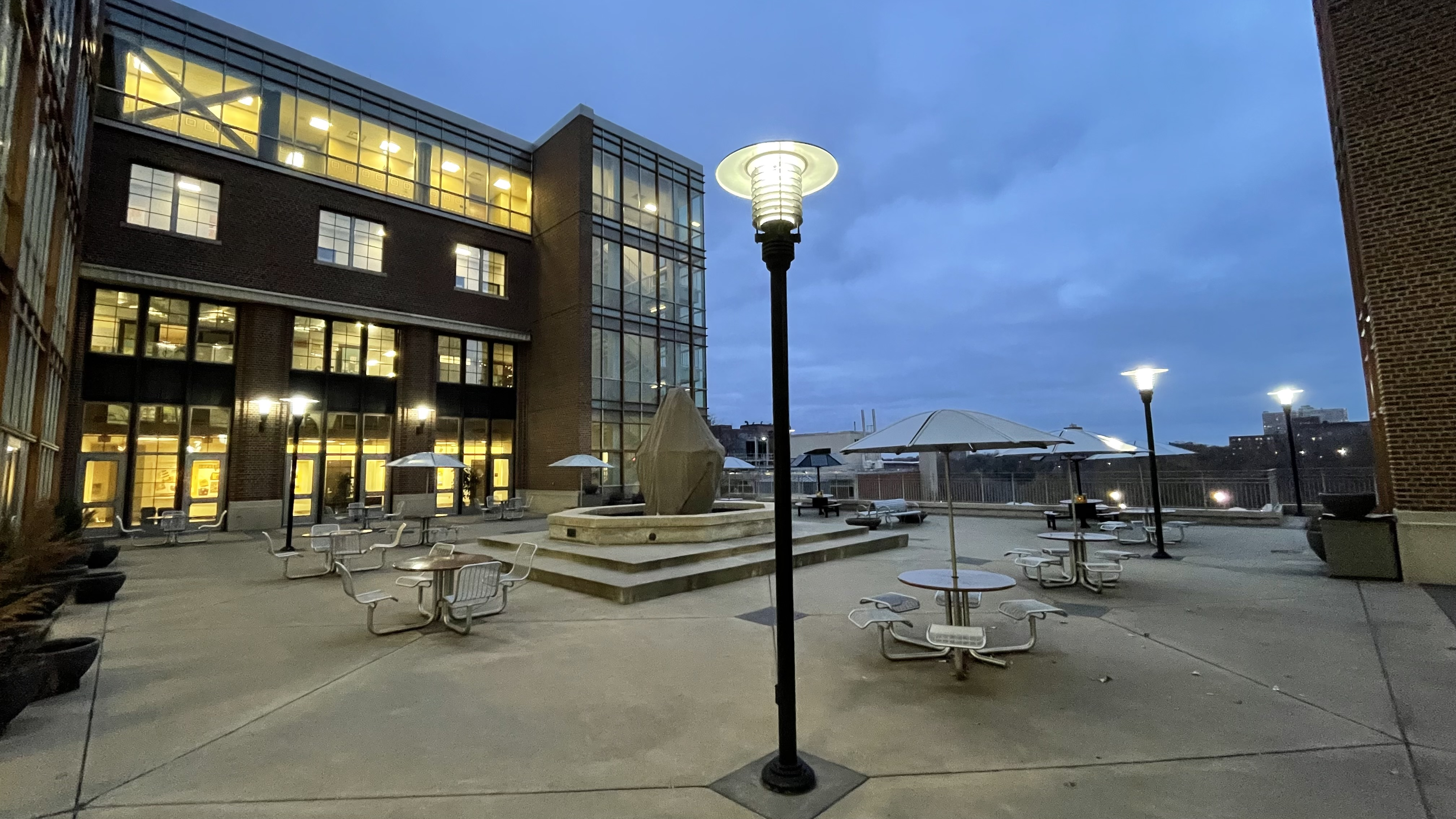
Coffman's back terrace

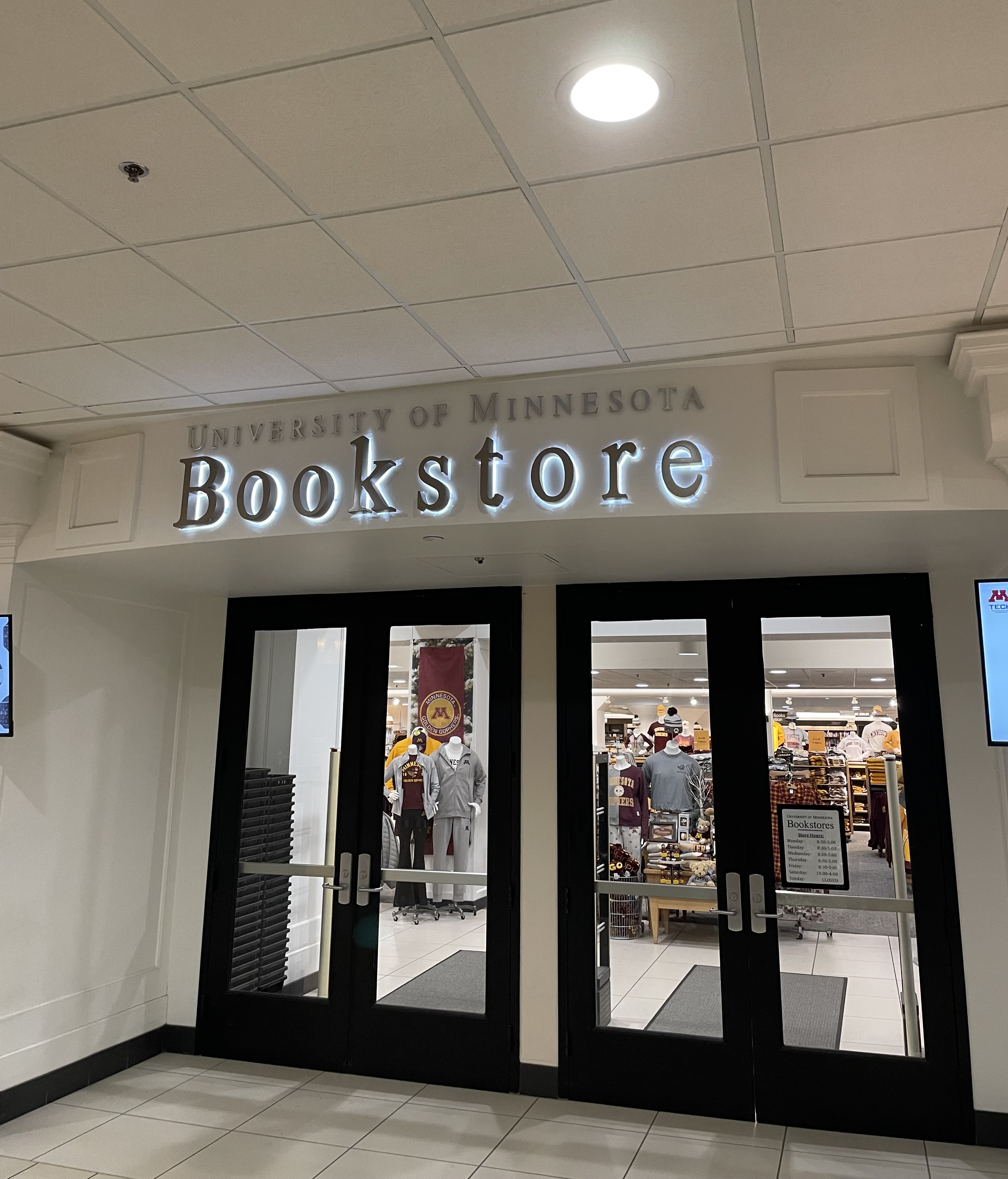
One of the entrances to the campus bookstore

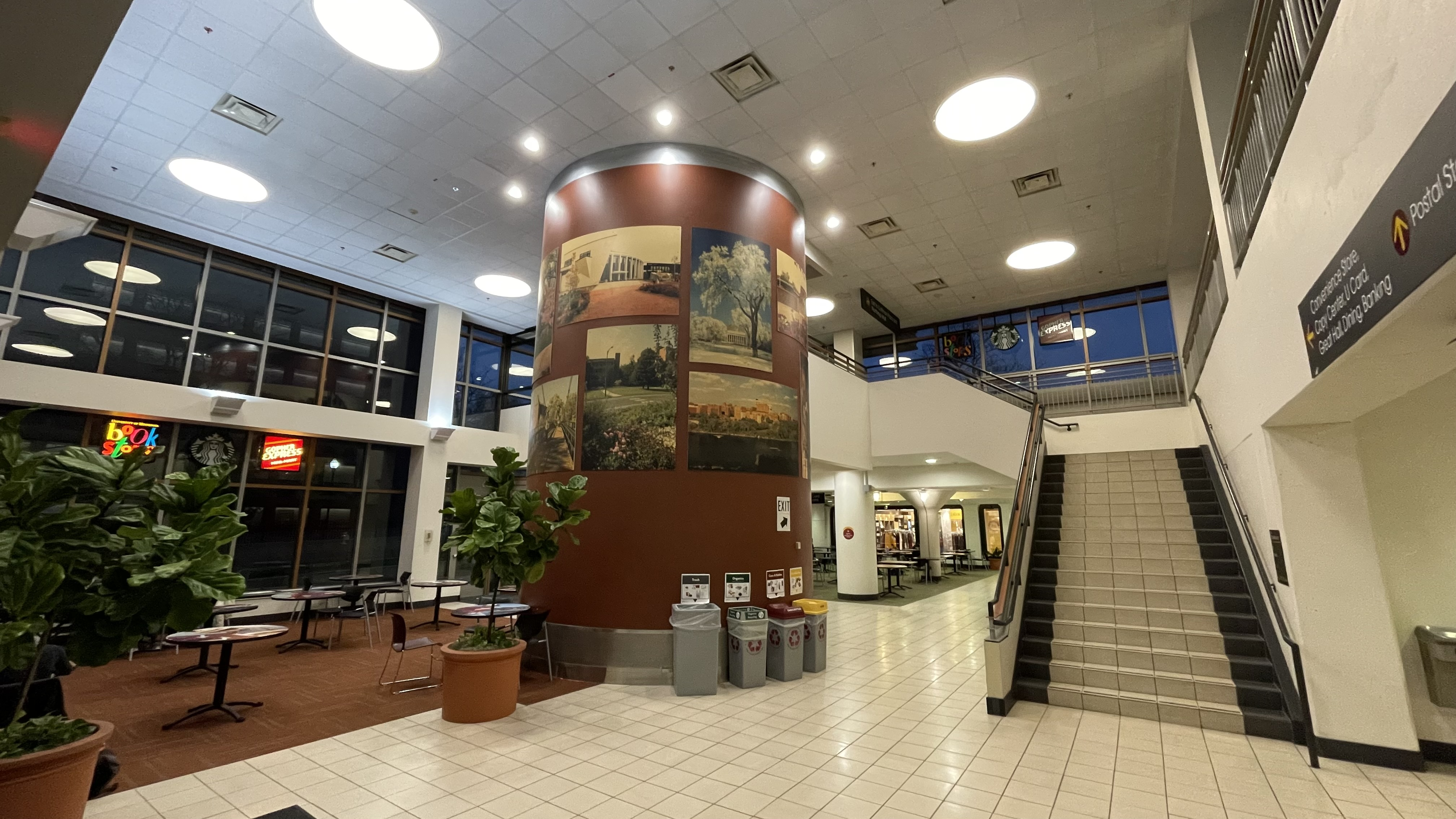
The Cube

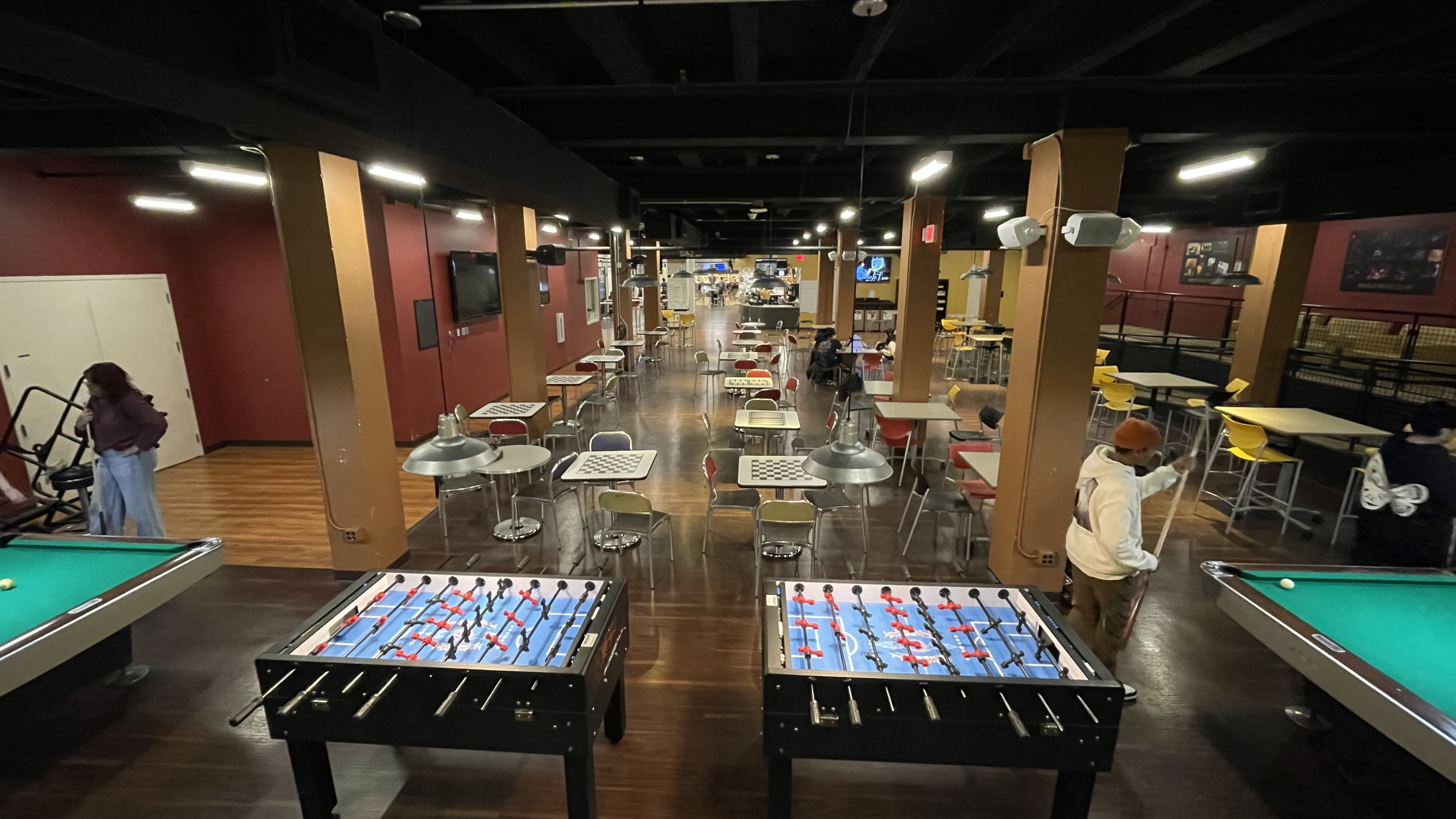
Goldy's Gameroom

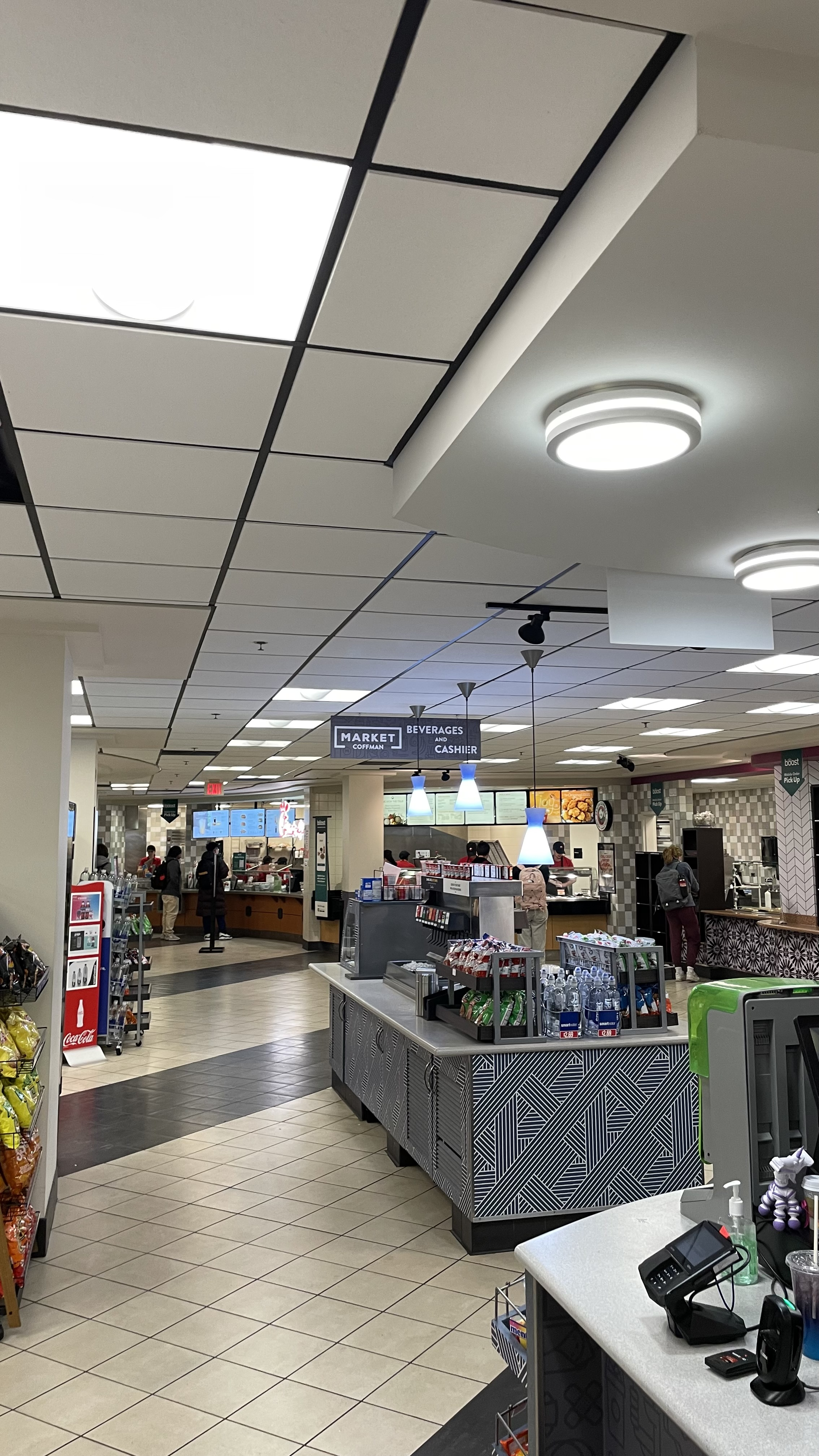
Food vendors in the Minnesota Marketplace, located in Coffman's lower level

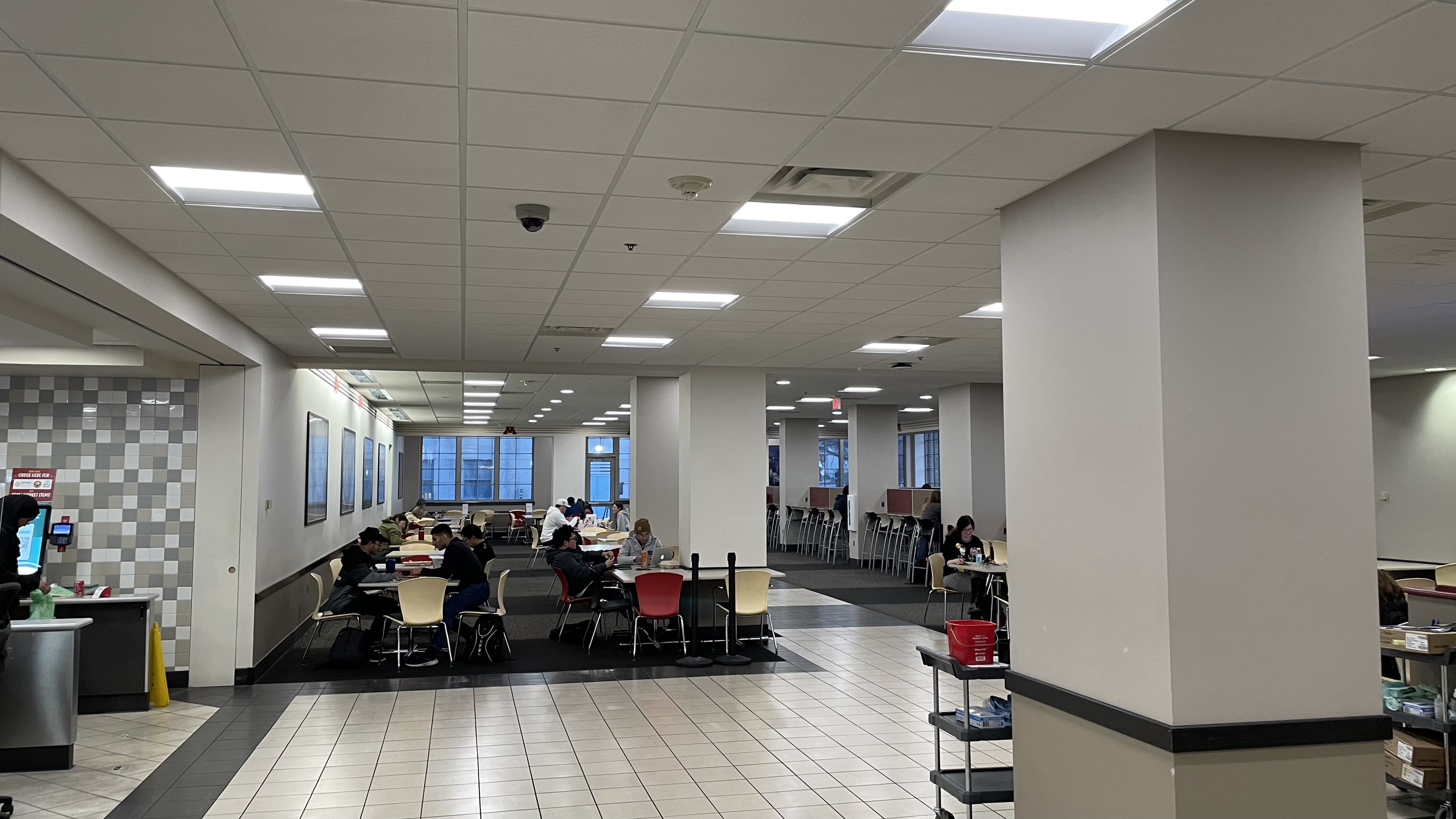
A dining hall intended for patrons of the Minnesota Marketplace
