= University of Minnesota College of Food, Agricultural and Natural Resource Sciences =

Agricultural school of the University of Minnesota

Coordinates: 44°59′1.9″N 93°11′06.2″W

The College of Food, Agricultural and Natural Resource Sciences (CFANS) is one of seventeen colleges and professional schools at the University of Minnesota. The College offers 14 majors, 3 pre-major and pre-professional majors and 26 freestanding minors for undergraduate students and a variety of graduate study options that include master's, doctoral and joint degree programs.

For the 2022-23 academic year, the College enrolled 1,765 undergraduate students and 553 graduate students in 13 programs, including interdisciplinary programs offered in collaboration with other colleges. The college employs 232 faculty members and hosts 10 research centers around the state that provide education, research and service to students and citizens.

== Majors/Minors ==
CFANS offers numerous programs of study. Majors include:

- Agricultural Education
- Agricultural Communication & Marketing
- Agricultural and Food Business Management
- Animal Science
- Applied Economics
- Bioproducts and Biosystems Engineering
- Environmental Sciences, Policy and Management
- Fisheries, Wildlife and Conservation Biology
- Food Science
- Forest and Natural Resource Management
- Nutrition
- Plant Science
- Sustainable Agriculture and Food Systems
- Sustainable Systems Management

Minors include:

- Agronomy
- Agricultural and Environmental Science Communication
- Agricultural and Food Business Management
- Agricultural and Food Education
- Animal Science
- Applied Economics
- Bioproducts Engineering
- Climatology
- Corporate Environmental Management
- Environmental Sciences, Policy and Management
- Fisheries and Wildlife
- Food Science
- Food Systems
- Forest Ecosystem Management and Conservation
- Geographic Information Science | This is a CLA minor that CFANS students can request to add directly from the CFANS minor add/drop form.
- Horticulture
- Insect Science
- International Agriculture
- Marine Biology
- Native American Environmental Knowledge
- Nutrition
- Park and Protected Area Management
- Soil Science
- Sustainable Agriculture
- Sustainability Studies
- Urban and Community Forestry
- Water Science
- Wildlife Care and Handling

== Student life ==
The St. Paul Campus is home to one residence hall. Bailey Hall is a community of 505 residents, many of whom are CFANS students. Bailey Hall offers living and learning communities that group residence by floors and are geared towards bringing students of similar majors together so that they can get the most out of their studies at the University of Minnesota. Communities found in Bailey Hall geared towards CFANS students include The Environment House, Pre-veterinary Science and St. Paul Leaders and Scholars.

Bailey Hall is attached to the St. Paul Campus Student Center which contains a movie theater and eight lanes of bowling, pool tables and arcade games located in the Gopher Spot. The student center also has great places to eat and hosts Gophers After Dark on the weekends.

== History ==
Agricultural education has been an integral part of the University of Minnesota since its inception. The original University charter, passed by the Territorial Legislature in 1851, named a Department of Agriculture as one of the five major divisions of the university. Instruction in agriculture did not commence until 1869 with the establishment of the College of Agriculture. In 1871, it became an independent unit, the Department of Agriculture.

The name was changed to the College of Agriculture, Forestry and Home Economics in 1917 to more accurately describe its course offerings. The Department of Agriculture was renamed the Institute of Agriculture in 1952, with all instruction in agriculture, forestry, home economics and veterinary medicine being offered within the Institute. In 1957, the School of Veterinary Medicine was designated as a separate college.

In 1970, the College of Agriculture, Forestry and Home Economics was reorganized, creating three separate departments within the Institute, the College of Agriculture, the School of Forestry and the School of Home Economics. In 1974, the name of the Institute was changed to the Institute of Agriculture, Forestry and Home Economics.

In 1995, the College of Agriculture changed its name to the College of Agricultural, Food and Environmental Sciences and was made an autonomous unit at the university.

The college as it stands today was formed on July 1, 2006, with the merger of two former colleges; the College of Agricultural, Food and Environmental Sciences, and the College of Natural Resources, as well as the Department of Food Science and Nutrition.

== Divisions and Departments ==
The College of Food, Agricultural and Natural Resource Sciences comprises six divisions, twelve academic units (two are held jointly), 10 research and outreach centers throughout Minnesota, the Bell Museum of Natural History and the Minnesota Landscape Arboretum.

== Affiliations ==
The Bell Museum of Natural History.

The James Ford Bell Museum of Natural History was established by state legislative mandate in 1872. Its governance belongs, by state legislative designation, to the University of Minnesota. The Bell Museum operates independently as a unit of CFANS.

The Bell Museum of Natural History is open to the public and classrooms for tours Tuesday through Sunday.

The Minnesota Landscape Arboretum features more than 1,000 acres (4.0 km^{2}) of magnificent gardens, model landscapes, and natural areas-from woodlands and wetlands to prairie-with extensive collections of northern-hardy plants. Tour the Arboretum on 12.5 miles (20.1 km) of garden paths and hiking trails. Walk the close gardens and bike, walk or drive Three-Mile Drive to see more gardens and collections.
