= Walter Coffey =

American academic administrator

- Coffey c. 1940s

7th President of the University of Minnesota
- In office 1941 – 1945
- Preceded by: Guy Stanton Ford
- Succeeded by: James Morrill

Personal details
- Born: 1876
- Died: 1956 (aged 79–80)
- Profession: Sheep herder, professor, and university administrator

Walter Coffey (1876–1956) was the seventh president of the University of Minnesota, serving from 1941 to 1945.

== Early years ==
Walter Coffey was raised in Hartsville, Indiana and worked with his father as a sheep herder where he began to grow a strong interest in animal husbandry.

== Education and career ==
Coffey received his initial educational degree from Franklin College and began teaching in Indiana Schools for six years. Following this, Coffey went to the University of Illinois at Urbana-Champaign and took a position as herdsman. Coffey realized that the university needed somebody to teach sheep raising and took full advantage of this opportunity. He then offered to teach the program and eventually worked his way from a student, to a graduate student, to a professor. During this period of time, Coffey received his B.S. in 1906, M.S. In 1909, and Ph.D. degrees all from the University of Illinois. Prior to becoming the President of the University of Minnesota, he was a Professor of Animal Husbandry there.

Academic offices
Preceded by Guy Stanton Ford	7th President of the University of Minnesota; 1941 — 1945	Succeeded by James Morrill
