= University of Minnesota Marching Band =

Marching band of the University of Minnesota

The University of Minnesota Marching Band
- Nickname: The Pride of Minnesota
- School: University of Minnesota
- Location: Minneapolis-St. Paul, MN
- Conference: Big Ten
- Founded: 1892
- Director: Betsy McCann
- Assistant Director: Emmanuel Rodriguez
- Members: 320
- Fight song: "Minnesota Rouser", "Minnesota March", "Minnesota Fight", "Our Minnesota", and "Go Gopher Victory"

Uniform
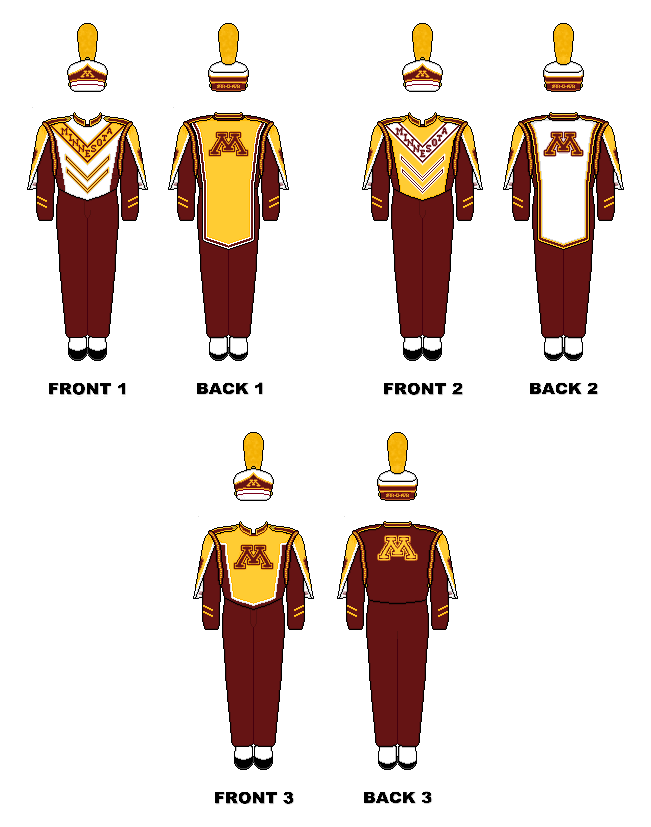

The University of Minnesota Marching Band (also known as UMMB, Minnesota Marching Band, and The Pride of Minnesota) is the marching band of the University of Minnesota and the flagship university band for the state of Minnesota. The Pride of Minnesota serves as an ambassador for the university, representing the school at major events both on and off campus. The band performs before, during, and after all home Golden Gopher football games and bowl games, occasional away games, local parades, numerous pepfests, exhibition performances, as well as a series of indoor concerts toward the end of the regular football season. Members of the band, along with non-member students, also participate in smaller athletic pep bands that perform at other major sporting events, including men's hockey, men's basketball, women's hockey, women's basketball, and women's volleyball.

== History ==
The University of Minnesota Marching Band was formed with 29 members as the University Cadet Band in 1892, functioning as part of the university cadet corps and stationed in the University of Minnesota Armory after its construction in 1896.

The University of Minnesota Marching Band was founded in 1892 as the University Cadet Band.

The band performed its first halftime field show during the 1910 football season at Northrop Field. Among the formations included was the "Block M" that now serves as the University's logo. The "Block M" formation remains present in the band's pregame show.

Near the end of World War I in 1918, the University Cadet Band was merged with the local Army band in order to form First Regiment of Minnesota Band, in addition to a second, more briefly existing Second Regiment of Minnesota Band. However, both bands were decommissioned along with the Regiment at the conclusion of the war. Following the war, university students who were members of the band were offered a position in a separate University Band, with the word "cadet" having been dropped from its name.

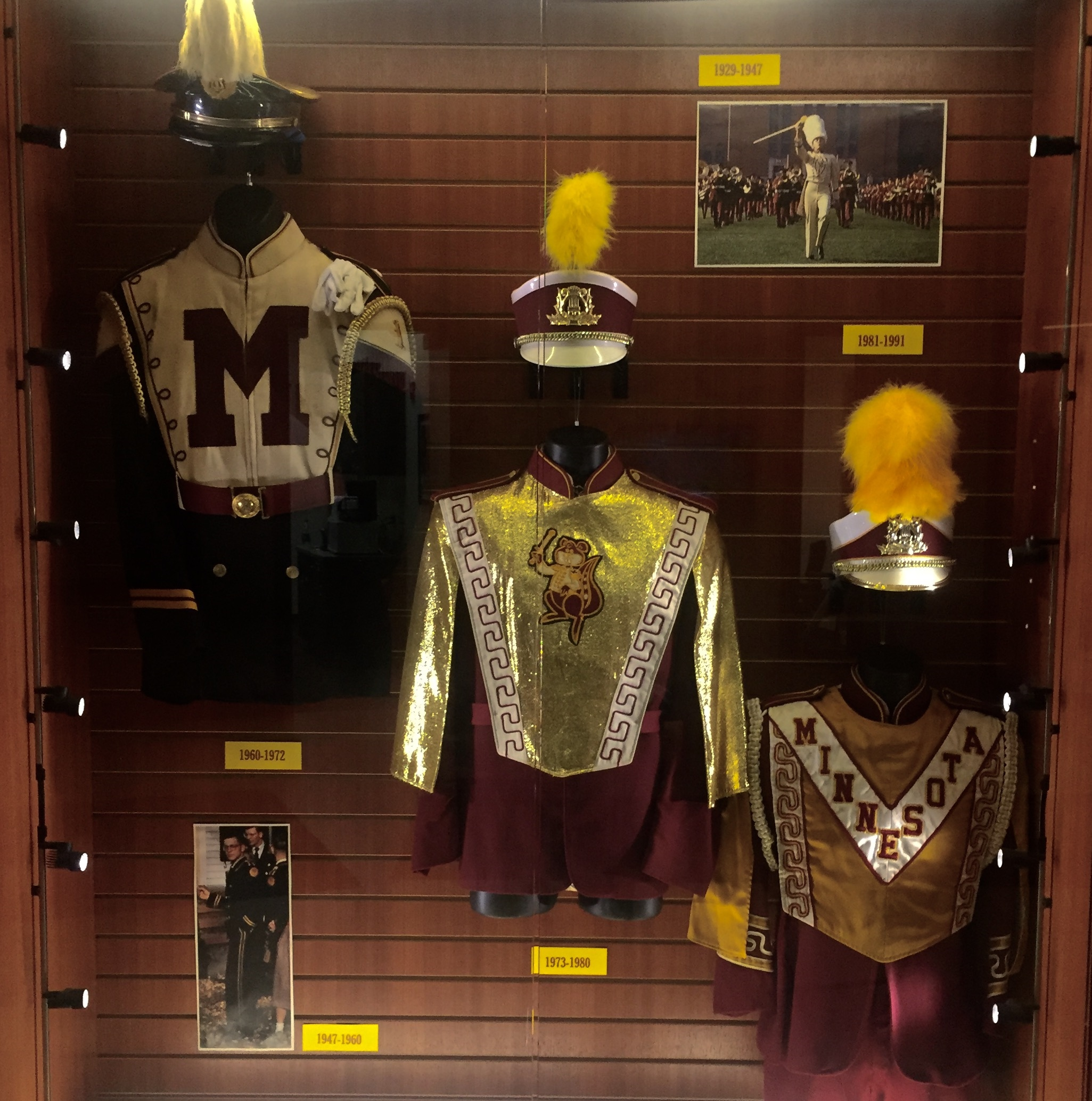
Former uniforms worn by the Pride of Minnesota. From left to right: 1960-1972, 1973-1980, 1981-1991.

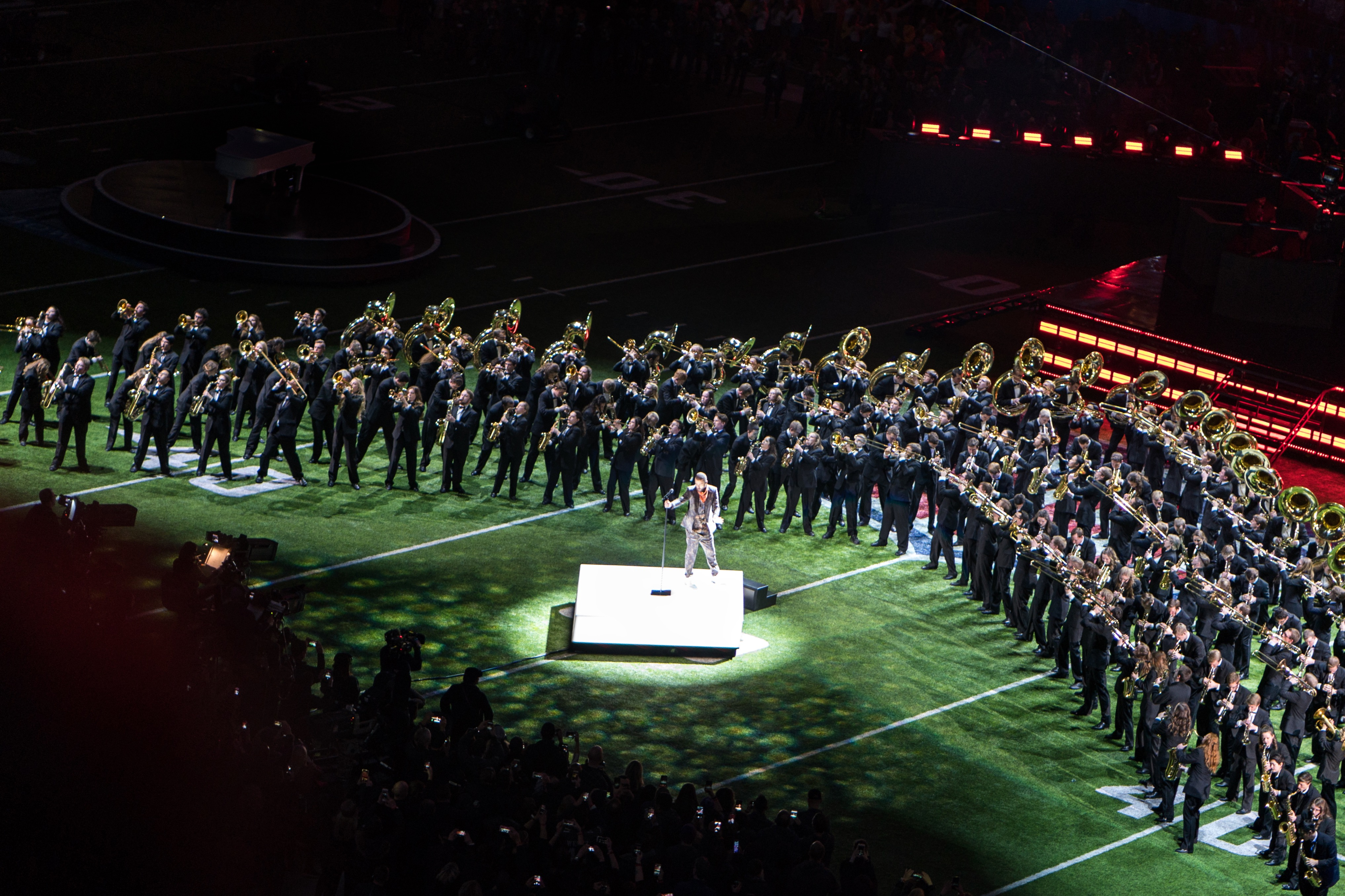
The Pride of Minnesota performing in the Super Bowl LII halftime show with Justin Timberlake.

After the 1923 football season, Memorial Stadium was constructed, and the band began to perform on the field, which was the home of football games and marching band shows for 57 years, the longest of any of the university's stadiums. The band "brought spectacle and song to game days," and halftime shows included moving renditions of rivalry trophies such as Floyd of Rosedale and the Little Brown Jug, as well as greetings to university figures such as football coach Bernie Bierman.

In January 1965, the Minnesota Marching Band was featured in the Inaugural Parade in Washington, DC for the second inauguration of U.S. President Lyndon B. Johnson.

In 1982, the band's performances moved once again after the opening of the Hubert H. Humphrey Metrodome and the subsequent relocation of Golden Gopher football from Memorial Stadium.

The Minnesota Marching Band performed during the halftime show of Super Bowl XXVI on January 26, 1992, along with former Olympic champions Brian Boitano and Dorothy Hamill, and singer Gloria Estefan.

In the fall of 2009, with the opening of TCF Bank Stadium (now Huntington Bank Stadium) on the university's campus, the band's game-day performances moved back to campus and to an outdoor field for the first time since leaving Memorial Stadium in 1981.

On February 4, 2018, the Minnesota Marching Band performed alongside Justin Timberlake in the halftime show of Super Bowl LII. The band was featured in Timberlake’s R&B hit “Suit & Tie”, and performed additional choreography and drill during “Mirrors" and the show’s finale, "Can't Stop the Feeling!".

Members of the band and the University of Minnesota Dance Team performed with the Jonas Brothers in concert at the Minneapolis Armory during the NCAA Division I Men's Basketball Final Four on April 6, 2019. The band joined the pop-rock group onstage for the finale of their newly-released single "Cool".

In March 2022, 30 members of the band traveled to Dubai in the United Arab Emirates for the World Expo 2020. The purpose of the trip was to perform as representatives on behalf of the University and the United States to generate excitement for Minnesota's bid to host Expo 2027 in Bloomington, MN. On the trip, the band played at numerous events, including a parade around the Expo for USA National Day, in front of the USA Pavilion, as well as for the United States ceremony. High-level audience members included Secretary of Commerce Gina Raimondo, as well as other dignitaries of the U.S. and UAE. The group also reached citizens from over 190 countries across the world.

In May 2022, members of the band played the Minnesota Rouser and Battle Hymn of the Republic at a memorial for Former Vice President Walter Mondale at Northrop Auditorium. At the memorial, the band performed following speeches from supporters of the program, including Governor Tim Walz and Senators Amy Klobuchar and Tina Smith. In addition to the hundreds of high-level attendees, the band joined President Joe Biden in concluding the memorial service.

On December 5, 2024, the band participated in a promotional event featuring Timothée Chalamet for the film A Complete Unknown, performing two of Bob Dylan's works.

=== Women in the Band ===
When it was originally formed, the band consisted of exclusively men. Women were first allowed to perform with the band in 1943-1945, when they were allowed to "fill in" for male members of the band that were serving in World War II. In 1950, a "Women's division" of the band was created, which lasted for several years. Women were allowed to be full members of the band in 1972 following the passage of Title IX. Molly Watters was selected in 2006 as the first female Drum Major in the history of the band. In July 2016, Betsy McCann was named the director of the band, becoming the first female director in the history of the band, and of all marching bands in the Big Ten Conference.

== Marching Style ==
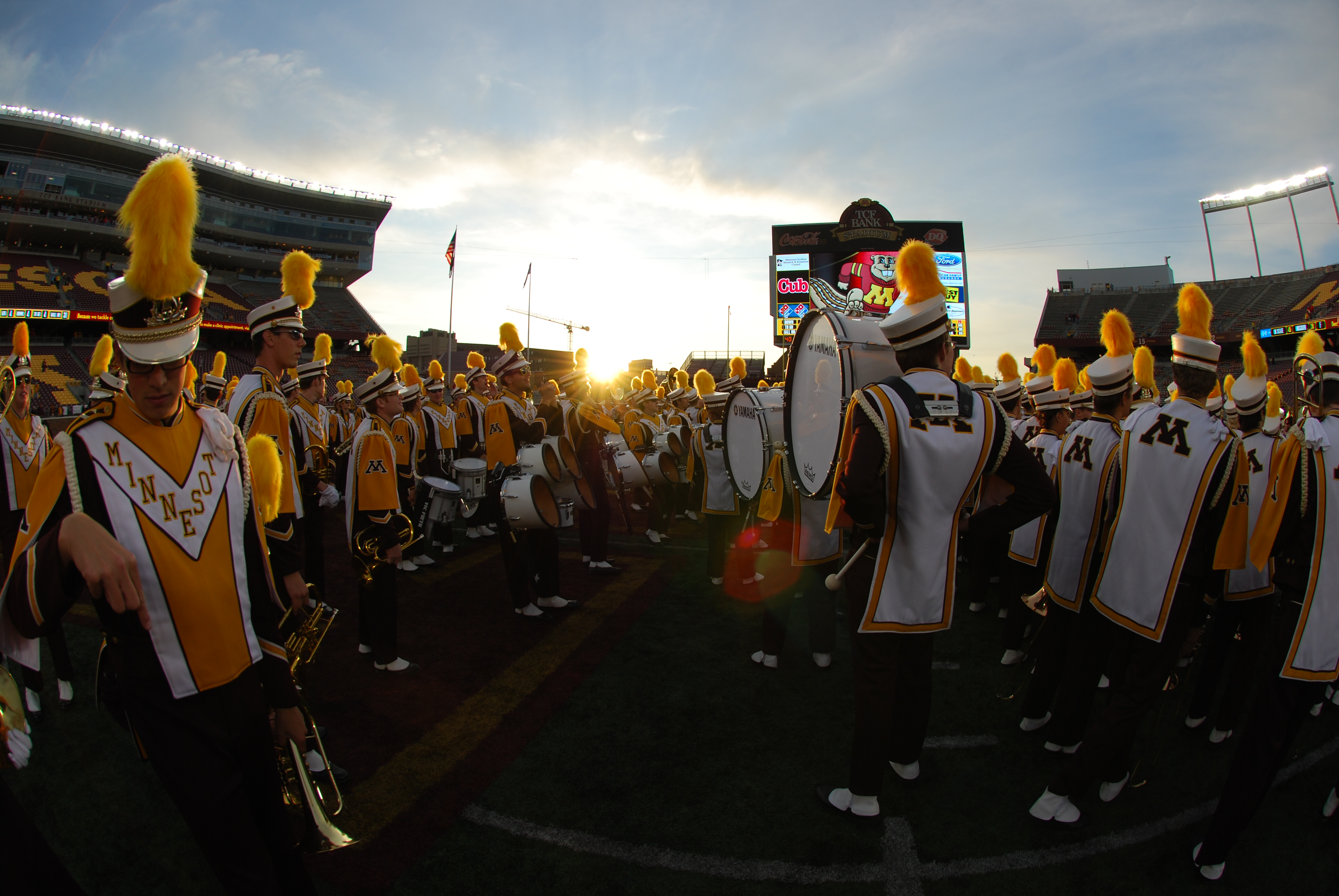
The Pride of Minnesota gathers on the field after the 4th quarter for their post-game performance.

The University of Minnesota Marching Band primarily uses both the chair step and glide step for performances, similar to other bands of the Big Ten Conference. The band's pregame show is performed almost entirely with chair step, which consists of bringing the leg up so that the thigh is parallel to the ground, the shin is completely vertical, and toes are pointed at the ground. Halftime shows are performed using corps-style glide step that allows for more musicality and forms that do not necessarily conform to a grid. "Run-Cadence" is the band's method of getting on and off the field for shows. It consists of a double-time chair step, although the quicker pace of it necessitates that at times neither foot is in contact with the ground, as is the case with the regular chair step.

== Facilities ==
Throughout much of its history, the University of Minnesota Marching Band's facilities were located in the University of Minnesota's Northrop Auditorium, where it shared space with several other campus organizations. However, in 2009, the band moved to specialized rehearsal facilities within the newly constructed TCF Bank Stadium. Following the 2021 merger of TCF Bank and Michigan-based Huntington Bank, the stadium rebranded to Huntington Bank Stadium, where the band now has daily access. Located on the northern side of Huntington Bank Stadium, the 20,000 square foot band facilities include a rotunda entrance, a rehearsal hall, ensemble practice rooms, a music and drill library, recording technology, archives, instrument and equipment storage, uniform storage, locker rooms, and showers. The facilities also serve as the band’s administrative offices, conference space, and study space for members, as well as a location to display photos, artifacts, and other elements of the band's history. During performances at football games, the marching band is located in a partitioned section of the stadium seating at the base of the student section and level with the eastern end of the stadium field. This section of the stadium, known as the "Pride Pit", is framed by a backdrop labeled Pride of Minnesota and is connected directly to the indoor facilities via the stadium tunnels and indoor hallways.

== Organization ==
=== Director ===
The University of Minnesota Marching Band has had 19 directors, some of whom held the position at multiple points throughout the band's history. The director of the band at its inception was Neville Staughton, at the time the director of the Winona community band and a Lieutenant in the Cadet Corps. However, Gerald R. Prescott, who was granted a professorship at the university music department in 1932, was the first full-time faculty director of the marching band. The sixth director, Michael Jalma, is credited with writing the lyrics to accompany John Philip Sousa's Minnesota March, one of the university's popular school songs. One of the most influential directors in the history of the band is Dr. Frank Bencriscutto, who was responsible for initiating many of the band's current traditions, such as the annual indoor concerts, as well as arranging many of the works currently used by the marching band, including the current arrangement of the Minnesota Rouser.

O'Neill Sanford was the first African-American band director in the Big Ten or in any Predominantly White Institution when he joined in 1976. He was the only historical African-American Big Ten director until Corey Pompey became director of the University of Wisconsin Marching Band in 2019.

The current director of the University of Minnesota Marching Band is Dr. Betsy McCann, who graduated from the University of Minnesota and holds graduate degrees from the University of Minnesota and Northwestern University. She was named director of the band in 2016 after the previous director, Timothy Diem, stepped down following sixteen years with the band. Dr. McCann, having formerly acted as the Assistant Director of the marching band, currently serves as both the Director of Marching and Athletic Bands as well as the Assistant Director of Bands at the University of Minnesota. Dr. McCann is the first female band director in the Big Ten, and as of 2026 acts as the Assistant Director of Bands at the University of Minnesota

Following are those who have held the position of director of the band:

- Betsy McCann (2016–Present)
- Timothy Diem (2005–2016)
- Jerry Luckhardt (1997–2004)
- Eric A. Becher (1991–1996)
- Barry E. Kopetz (1986–1990)
- O'Neill Sanford (1976–1985)
- Frank Bencriscutto (1960-1976, 1985 - 1986)
- Gale Sperry (1957-1960)
- Ernest Villas (1950-1951)
- Merton Utgaard (1945-1946)
- Daniel Martino (1943-1945)
- Gerald R. Prescott (1932-1943, 1946-1950, 1951-1957)
- William A. Abbott (1931-1932)
- Michael Jalma (1920-1931)
- Karl Scheurer (1919-1920)
- J. Arthur Lampe (1918-1919)
- B. A. Rose (1898-1918)
- Charles W. Graves (1894-1898)
- Neville Staughton (1892-1894)

=== Assistant Director ===
Dr. Emmanuel Rodriguez is the current Assistant Director of Athletic Bands. Prior to joining the School of Music, Rodriguez served on the faculties of Indiana State University and the University of Louisiana at Monroe. Previously, he served as Director of Bands at Miramar High School in Florida, where he reanimated the historic program by quadrupling student enrollment and achieving consistently high ratings in district and state evaluations. Rodriguez has earned degrees from Louisiana State University, the University of Central Florida, and Florida Agricultural and Mechanical University.

Drum Majors
Years	Name
2026 – Present	Nathan Orcutt
2025	Charlotte Baker
2023–24	Ari Martin
2022	Jon Ingram
2021	Julia White
2019–20	Chamberlain Gregg
2017–18	Tommy Greco
2015–16	Robert Rudin
2014	Joe Walsh
2011–13	Brandon Folkes
2008–10	Aaron Marks
2006–07	Molly Watters
2005	Dick Osterberg
2004	John Thompson
2002–03	Jon Tepe
2001	Todd Olin
1998–2000	Andy Richter
1996–97	Alec Charais
1995	J. Drew Kunkel
1993–94	Chad Saloka
1992	Aaron Fisher
1987–91	Kirk Juergens
1985–86	Ed Long
1983–84	Jeff Thomas
1981–82	Dan Kuch
1978–80	Grant Benjamin
1977	Pat Patton
1975–76	Jim Krikava
1974	Charles Buck
1971–73	Bryan Warren
1967	Bill Ekstrum
1966–70	Jim Mitchell
1961–65	Richard Johnson
1958–60	M. William Johnson
1954–57	Don Elsen
1949–53	Jim Wetherbee
1947–48	Robert Thompson
1945–47	John N. Smith
1944	Albert Burns
1943	John Gruye
1942	Jerry Benson
1940	William Balamut

=== Drum Major ===
The University of Minnesota Marching Band has a single drum major. In its history, the University of Minnesota Marching Band has had 69 drum majors, with some having held the position for up to five seasons. The drum major is considered the leading member of the ensemble, and acts as an instructor, spokesperson, and performer. The responsibilities of the drum major include marching and mace-spinning performances on the field during shows, conducting the band in the stands during games, leading parades, and acting as a leader and teacher during rehearsals. Similarly to the position in other marching bands in the Big Ten Conference, the drum major is known for the execution of the traditional "back bend" during the pregame show, where they bend backwards until their head touches the ground. The current drum major of the University of Minnesota Marching Band is Nathan Orcutt.

=== Block Captain ===
The marching band has one block captain, who is considered a partner to the drum major in leading the band, and serves as a backup performer to the drum major. Like the drum major, the position is of a leadership and instructional nature. The current block captain of the University of Minnesota Marching Band is Brennen Lishman.

=== Feature Twirler ===
Like other Big Ten marching bands, the University of Minnesota has a section of baton twirlers. The twirlers of the Minnesota Marching Band consist of three Feature Twirlers. The position of Feature Twirler is competitive and involves a rigorous audition process. The twirlers are responsible for marching on the field during pregame and halftime shows as well as in parades. The Feature Twirlers perform dynamic baton routines that involve a variety of turns and catches, toss illusions, baton work, and occasional use of fire batons. The current Feature Twirlers for the University of Minnesota are Sydney Nikodem, Greta Gordon, and Elliot-Marie Kershaw.

=== Instrumentation ===
The Pride of Minnesota consists of approximately 320 members, and has a complete marching band instrumentation consisting of flutes, piccolos, clarinets, alto saxophones, tenor saxophones, trumpets, mellophones, trombones, baritones, tubas, drumline, and color guard. The drumline, which makes up 30 of the 320 members of the band, consists of 8 snare drums, 6 multi-tenor drums, 6 bass drums, and 10 cymbals. Beyond its traditional instrumentation, the University of Minnesota Marching Band also has a section of Big Ten flags, which represent the conference and its 18 member schools, and are featured solely during the pregame show. Each instrumental and auxiliary section has a group of student leaders who combined make up the student leadership team of the band.

== Training ==
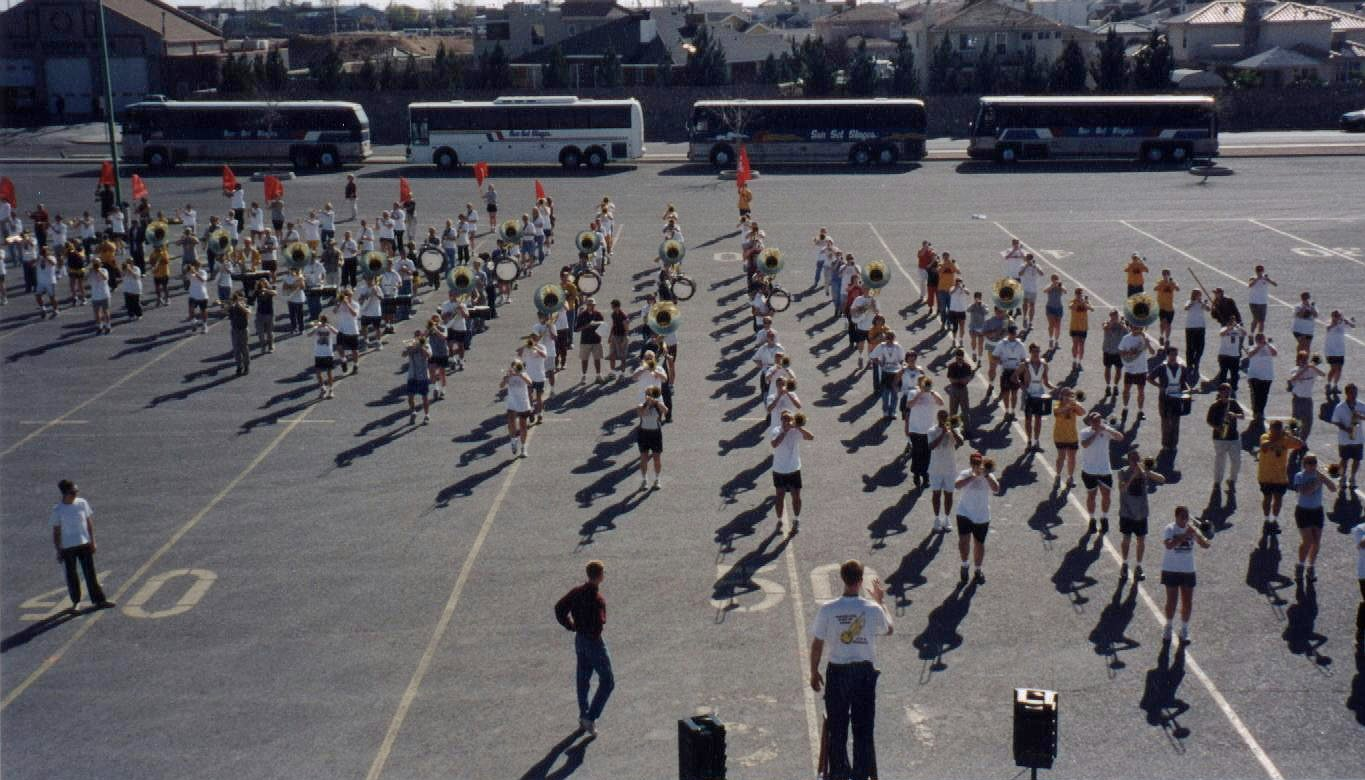
The marching band practices in El Paso, Texas before the 1999 Sun Bowl.

=== Spat Camp ===
Training for the University of Minnesota Marching Band begins annually with "Spat Camp," a ten-day training, conditioning, and preparation period in late August where both new and returning members learn, relearn, and practice marching fundamentals, music, and drill. During Spat Camp, marching band members stay in university residence halls, rehearse at Huntington Bank Stadium, and participate in the first round of assessments for the pregame block. The student leadership team arrives first each season for a three-day leadership training period, followed by new members, who arrive two days prior to returning members in order to learn basic fundamentals. Each day of the ten-day period lasts up to 13 hours, and consists of music rehearsals, marching practice, choreography, and instrument sectionals. The period ends with the band's performance at the Minnesota State Fair Parade on the weekend before Labor Day. The name "Spat Camp" was derived from the nature of the training period as a musical equivalent to a military boot camp, referring to the spats worn by marchers instead of boots.

=== Rehearsals ===
During the regular fall semester academic season, the marching band holds two-hour rehearsals on Monday through Thursday evenings at Huntington Bank Stadium. On weekends of home football games, the band also rehearses on Friday evenings and Saturday mornings. The rehearsal schedule of the band is designed to avoid conflict with most university classes. The three athletic pep bands associated with the marching band hold rehearsals once per week in the late evenings after the regular marching band rehearsal.

== Traditions ==
=== Indoor Concerts ===
In 1961, marching band director Dr. Frank Bencriscutto decided that, in addition to performing at football games, the band should also put on an indoor concert at which the band would be the sole performers, instead of taking a role secondary to that of the football team. This was the first concert of its kind; many other collegiate marching bands have adopted this practice since. The Indoor Concerts, which now consist of several concerts each year during late November, have been almost continuously performed at the University of Minnesota's Northrop Auditorium since their creation. However, in 2011, the auditorium closed to begin a three-year renovation, causing the marching band to perform three of its annual concerts in varying locations across the state of Minnesota, including concerts in Rochester, Minnesota and Willmar, Minnesota. The band returned to performing its regular concert series at Northrop Auditorium after the renovation was completed in 2014. In addition to the two annual concerts, the band has occasionally performed concerts at the Mayo Civic Center in Rochester.

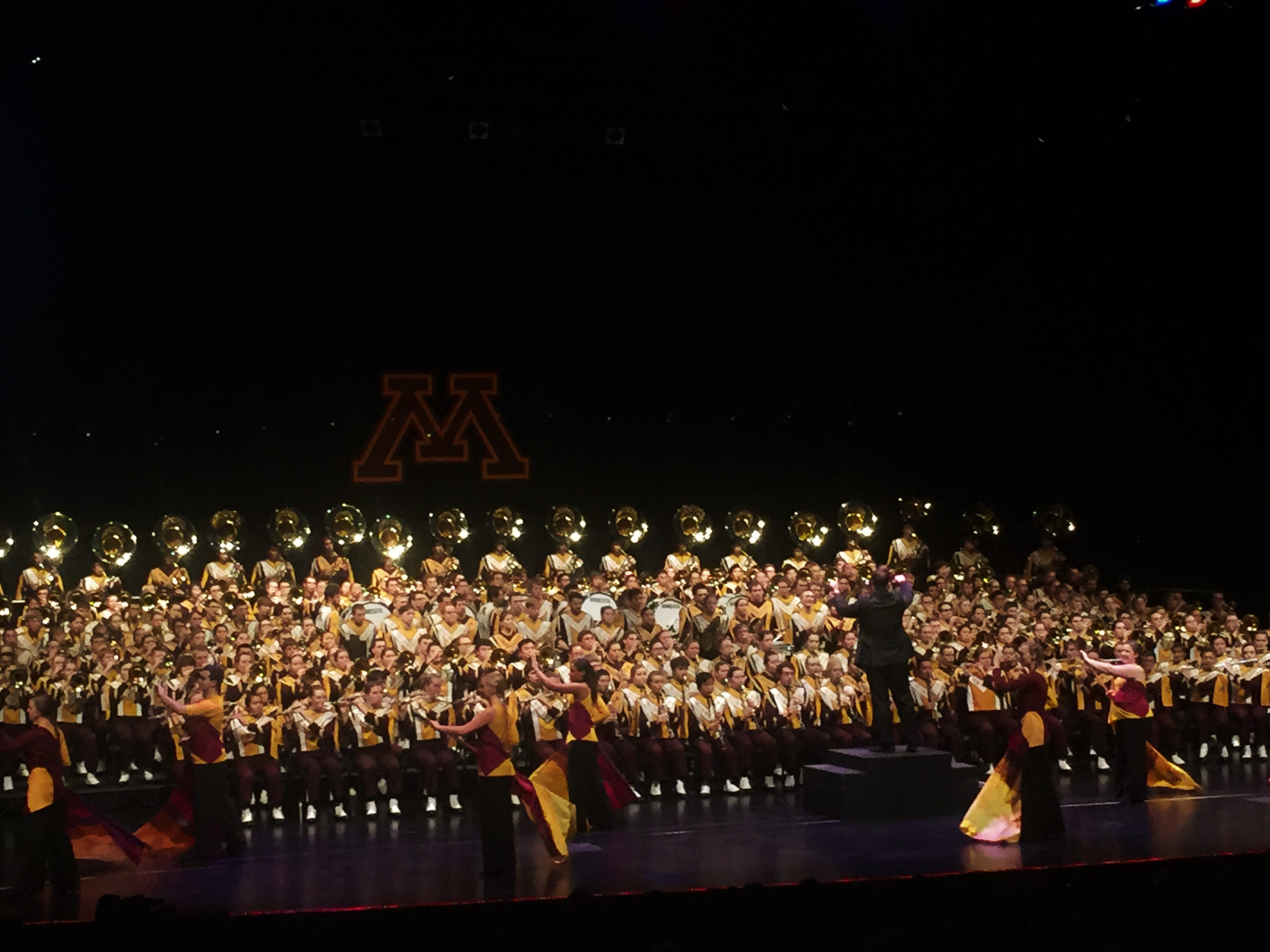
The University of Minnesota Marching Band performing at their 2015 indoor concert.

=== Homecoming Parade ===
Every year during homecoming, the Minnesota Marching Band performs in a parade along University Avenue, with the current route beginning in Dinkytown and ending at Huntington Bank Stadium. The parade also features campus organizations, clubs, faculty, the Gopher Spirit Squad, and the University of Minnesota Alumni Marching Band. The parade began as a part of homecoming celebrations in the early 1900s as a way to promote school spirit, though the location of the parade has changed over time, having also traveled down Washington Avenue through the center of campus. The parade has been cancelled only ten times in the past during both world wars and the Vietnam War. In 1942, the parade was billed as "the largest parade in the world" at 2 miles long and featuring 170 cars and floats.

=== Mound of Sound ===
In addition to the formations included as part of its pregame show, the Minnesota Marching Band is known for its traditional "Mound of Sound", a halftime drill formation where, as described by the announcer, they "put a really big band in a really small circle". Performed since the early 1990s in the Metrodome, the drill form is executed while playing Glenn Miller's big band hit "In the Mood", and consists of the band forming concentric circles and collapsing them to fit all 320 musicians in a 12-meter wide mound-shaped circular formation in the center of the field. At the conclusion of the song, the "mound" is expanded outward once again.

=== "Hail! Minnesota" ===
At the end of every rehearsal, performance, or other band event, the members, faculty, and staff of the marching band join together to sing an acapella arrangement of the university's alma mater and the state hymn, Hail! Minnesota. In addition, after every home football game, the football players and coaches gather in front of the band and student section and sing while the band plays the piece.

== Pregame Show ==
The University of Minnesota Marching Band performs a pregame show. There are 244 marching spots in the pregame block out of the 320 total marching spots within the band.

=== Swinging Gates ===
As a part of the pregame show, the band plays The Battle Hymn of the Republic while creating a series of eight parallel lines, or "gates", spread sequentially down the length of the field, facing the student section and the east end of the stadium. As the song is played, the University's ROTC honor guard, led by the color guard and followed by the drum major, marches down the center of the field toward the student section as the band begins to "swing" open each gate by splitting each line of marchers into four pivoting sections. As the honor guard proceeds down the field, each of the eight gates closes behind them until the guard and drum major are positioned in front of the student section and the final fanfare of the song is played. This drill, known as the "Swinging Gates Formation", has been performed during the band's pregame show since 1961.

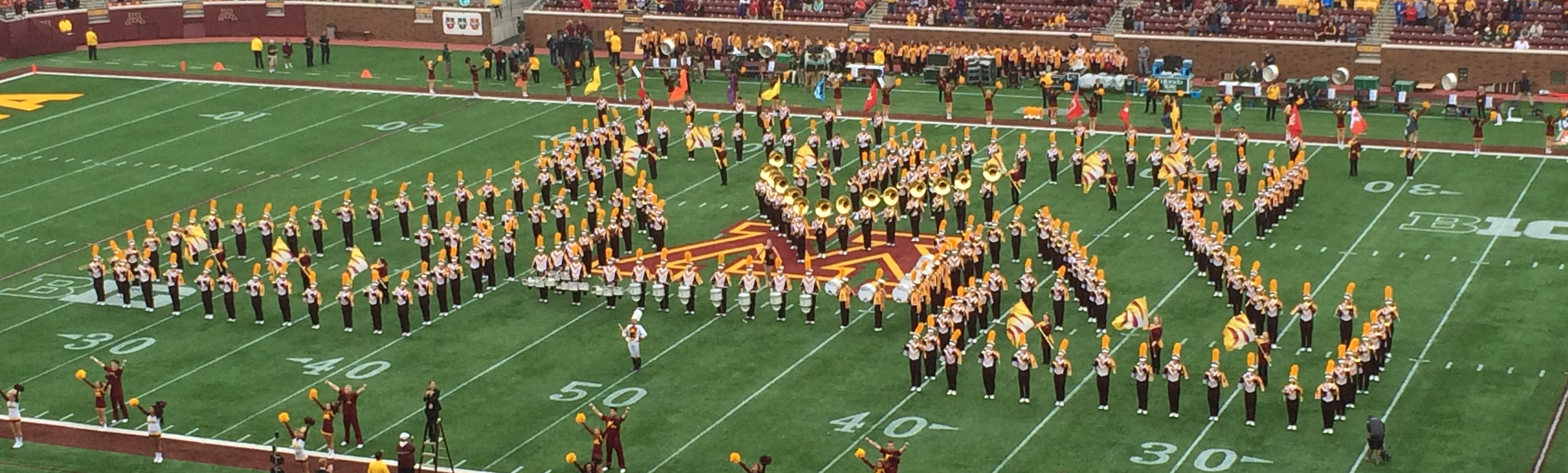
The Pride of Minnesota in the Block M formation.

== Halftime Shows ==
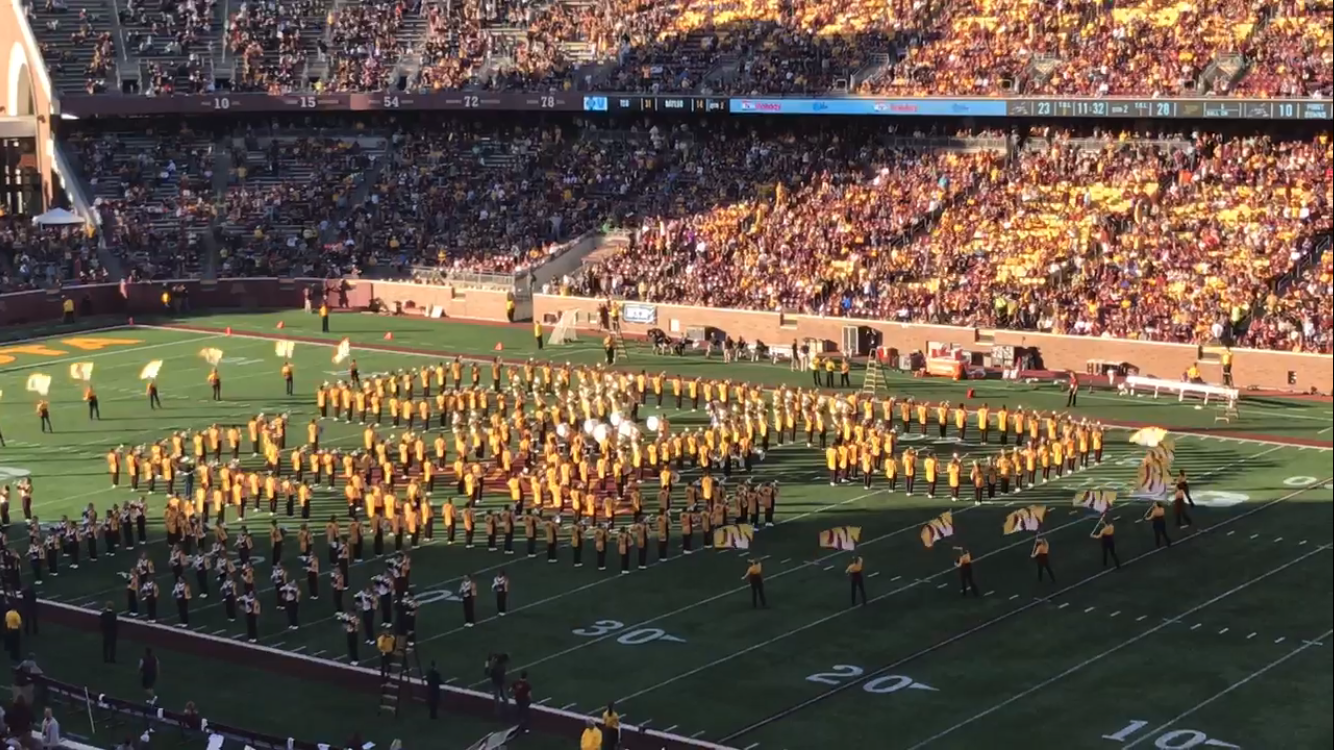
The University of Minnesota Marching Band performs during halftime at TCF Bank Stadium.

As is customary of bands in the Big Ten Conference, the University of Minnesota Marching Band performs a different halftime show for every home football game. Music is memorized for each performance, which combined results around 30 memorized pieces for halftime shows throughout the season. The majority of the music included in halftime shows is also featured in the marching band's series of Indoor Concerts at the end of each season.

On October 11, 2025, Red Hot Chili Peppers drummer and Minnesota native Chad Smith performed along with The Pride of Minnesota at halftime during the Golden Gophers homecoming football game. The performance was part of a partnership between the Chad Smith Foundation, and the University of Minnesota.

== Gopher Groove ==
Members of the University of Minnesota Marching Band, along with non-member students, may audition and participate in the Gopher Groove, which is the athletic pep band for the University of Minnesota. The pep band group is divided into "maroon," "white," and "gold" bands so members are only required to attend approximately a third of the games. The athletic bands are taken by students as a university course for credit, share marching band rehearsal space at Huntington Bank Stadium, and hold rehearsals weekly in the evenings after marching band rehearsal. The bands each perform at roughly 75 regular season athletic events over the course of each year, along with several postseason events during conference and NCAA tournaments. Both the "maroon," "white," and "gold" bands play at games for various teams, including men's and women's hockey, men's and women's basketball, and women's volleyball.
