= Ski-U-Mah (slogan) =

University of Minnesota slogan

Ski-U-Mah (/ˌskaɪjuːˈmɑː/ SKY-yoo-MAH) is a slogan used at the University of Minnesota since 1884, when the newly emerging football team was coached by Thomas Peebles, a philosophy professor and former Princeton University faculty member.

During the team's scrimmages, Peebles would often yell "Sis-Boom-Ah, Princeton!" after a score, relying on a cheer from his alma mater. Team captain John W. Adams and a co-captain sought a counter-cheer with "a characteristic Minnesota flavor". While brainstorming, Adams recalled hearing native Dakota boys yell "ski-oo!" in athletic contests and canoe races at Lake Pepin.

Adams incorrectly interpreted that phrase as the Dakota word for victory, or exultation, and suggested it as a cheer for the university rugby team. His co-captain, "Win" Sargent, added the "mah" to make it rhyme with "rah". They used the cheer in their practices and games, and the campus paper (the Ariel) endorsed the cheer soon after.

== Use ==
The slogan has been used to cheer on the Minnesota Golden Gophers athletics teams, and was written into the lyrics of university songs including the "Minnesota Rouser", "Go Gopher Victory", "Minnesota Fight", and "Minnesota March".

The slogan has also had other uses. In the mid-20th century, Ski-U-Mah was a University of Minnesota humor magazine. It is used on the football team's helmets and jerseys, as the name of a meeting room at the McNamara Alumni Center, a campus tailgate lot/parking lot near Huntington Bank Stadium, and as the title of a yearbook-style publication put out by the Minnesota Daily.

Ski Yu Mah Lounge was a Prohibition-era speakeasy near campus where players and other locals gathered after games. The Gopher football team was prominent during the Prohibition era, and the use of the phrase in the school rouser is said to be a holdover in commemoration of the lounge and the time period.

== Interpretation ==
Dakota–Lakota specialists say that "Ski-U" or "Ski-yoo" or "Ski-oo" is neither a Dakota victory cry nor the Dakota word for winning. What Adams heard on Lake Pepin, "ski-oo", may have just been an interjection, like "woo hoo."

Other Dakota-Lakota words or phrases that have been suggested for what Adams heard include:

- "Scheeh" or "scheen-shay", which means "Try Hard"
- "Schkee ooh poh!" or "Scheee ooh!", meaning "Try hard, come on!"
- "Oh-hee-yah", which means "To win"
- "Oh-hee-un-yum" or "oh-hee-oohn-yum", which means "We won"
