= Minnesota Golden Gophers Spirit Squads =

Collegiate cheerleading organization

The University of Minnesota Golden Gophers Spirit Squads comprise the cheerleading organization at the Twin Cities campus of the University of Minnesota. Being the first program ever to form worldwide, the University of Minnesota is consequently considered the "Birthplace of Cheerleading". Today, the Gopher Spirit Squads consist of four separate squads: a cheer squad, a dance team, a hockey cheer squad, and the school's mascot, Goldy Gopher. The squads consistently perform well at national competitions including 21 national championships in dance since 2003, a 2nd-place finish for All-Girl in 2013, a fifth-place finish in 2017, and four-time national champion Goldy Gopher in 2011, 2013, 2017, and 2018. The current head coach is Sam Owens.

== History ==
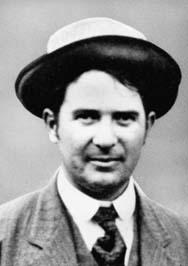
Johnny Campbell

The precursors of cheerleading began appearing at Princeton University in the latter half of the 19th century. In the 1880s, when Princeton graduate Thomas Peebles brought the game of American football to Minnesota, he also brought the idea of organized fan cheers. It wasn't until 1898, after a losing streak in football, that a Minnesota student named Johnny Campbell began leading cheers forming a squad of yell-leaders for the football game between Northwestern University and Minnesota. Campbell directed a crowd in cheering "Rah, Rah, Rah! Ski-u-mah, Hoo-Rah! Hoo-Rah! Varsity! Varsity! Varsity, Minn-e-So-Tah!", making Campbell the very first cheerleader. Minnesota won the game 17-6 with the credit for that victory largely going to Campbell and his squad. The "Ski-U-Mah" phrase and other cheers similar to the original yell are still used at the university by the Spirit Squads, as well as by the marching band and across the university.

In the 1920s, gymnastics and other athletic motions were first incorporated into routines by Minnesota's cheerleaders. Co-ed cheerleading was allowed at the University of Minnesota in 1940, and at that point other schools followed as cheerleading began to transform from a largely male activity to a largely female activity.

Today, though the pioneering is now dominated by all-star programs and cheerleading schools, the Minnesota Spirit Squads continue to lead at the collegiate level consistently reaching national finals and finishing in the top 10 as cheerleading is changing from being an activity in support of other sports to being a sport of its own.

== Coaches ==
The Spirit Squad coaches have remained relatively consistent since Sam Owens took over the program after graduating from it in the early 1990s. The 2023-2024 list of coaches is below.

- Head Coach and Spirit Program Director / Dance Team Coach: Amanda Gaines
- Cheer Team Coach - Dan Weaver
- Hockey Cheer Team Coach - Niki Heyward
- Mascot Team Coach - Wyatt Fitzsimmons
- Cheer Assistant Coaches - Abby DeThorne, Matt Reiser
- Dance Team Assistant Coaches - Tia Tumbleson, Lauren Busyn
- Mascot Team Assistant Coach - Carter Melsha

== Squads ==
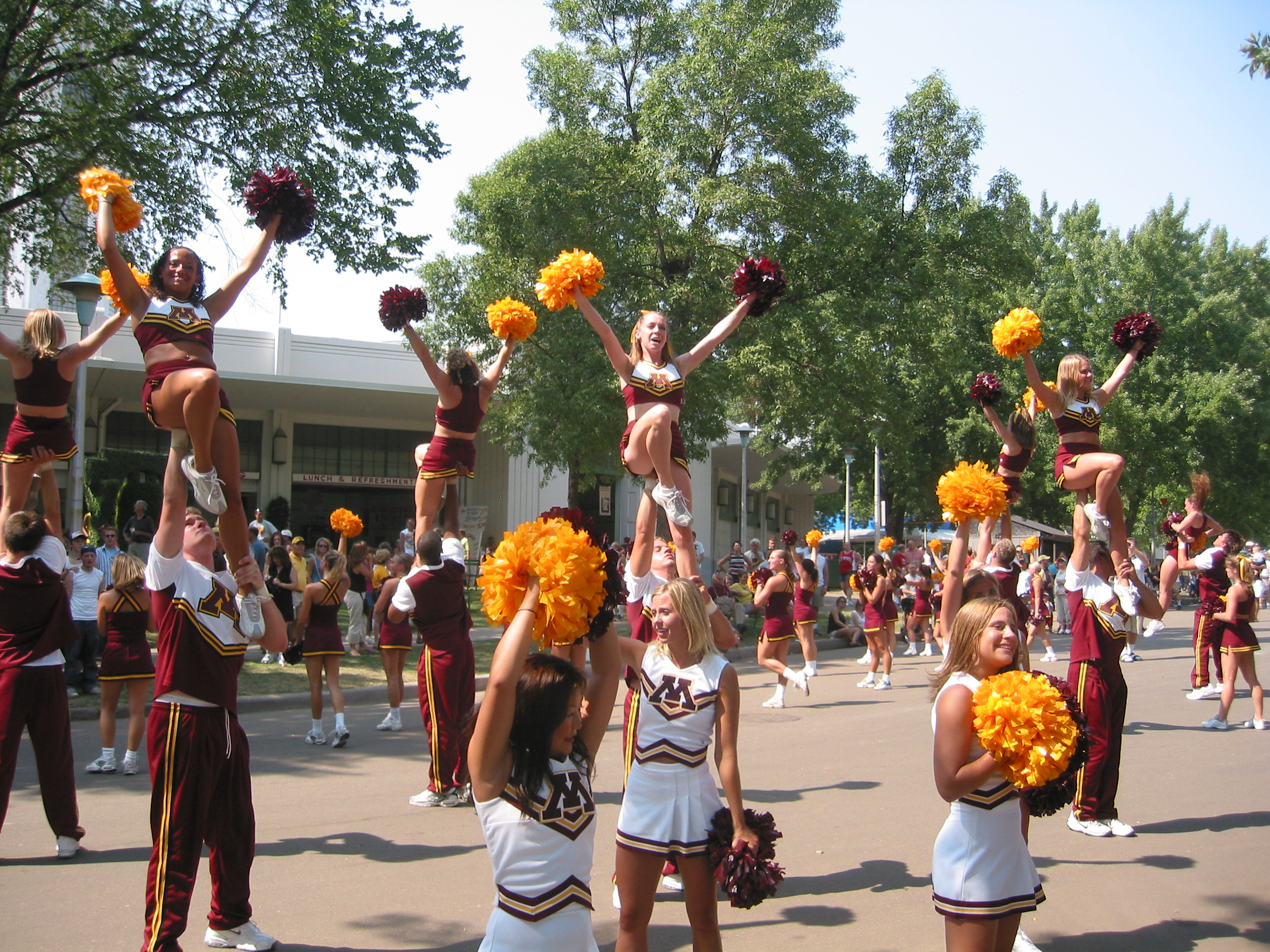
The Golden Gophers Spirit Squads at the Minnesota State Fair in 2003.

=== Co-Ed/Small Co-Ed Cheer ===
The Co-Ed and Small Co-Ed Cheer squads consists of both men and women, though size varies from year to year. They primarily appear at football and basketball games and are an annual participant of UCA Finals.

=== All Girl Cheer ===
The All-Girl Cheer squad consists of all women as members. They primarily appear at football and women's basketball games and are an annual participant of UCA Finals. The All Girl Squad placed 3rd in 2011, 5th in 2012, 2nd in 2013, and 5th in 2017.

=== Dance Team ===
The Minnesota Dance Team consists of 25 dancers. The Dance Team typically performs at football and basketball home games as well as post-season games. Between 2003 and 2006, the team won four straight national championships in UDA Jazz competitions. They won another 4-peat National Championship in both Division 1A Jazz and Pom in 2010, 2011, 2012, and 2013. The team won the national championship again in Division 1A Jazz and Pom in 2014, and in Pom in 2015 as well as 2016 while taking 2nd in Jazz both years. In 2017, the team won national championships again in both Division 1A Jazz and Pom.

The team has achieved national success at the Universal Dance Association College Nationals, winning 24 titles in Jazz and Pom since 2003, including consecutive wins in Pom from 2023–2026 and multiple Jazz championships.

Notable alumna Mary LeVoir danced for the Minnesota team before competing on So You Think You Can Dance, and later became a professional choreographer and coach.

Year	National Championships	Category
2003	1	Jazz
2004	1	Jazz
2005	1	Jazz
2006	1	Jazz
2010	2	Jazz, Pom
2011	2	Jazz, Pom
2012	2	Jazz, Pom
2013	2	Jazz, Pom
2014	2	Jazz, Pom
2015	1	Pom
2016	1	Pom
2017	2	Jazz, Pom
2019	1	Jazz
2023	2	Jazz, Pom
2024	1	Pom
2025	1	Pom
2026	1	Pom

=== Hockey Cheer ===
Although the Minnesota Spirit Squads compete annually in national competitions, the Hockey Cheer is now the only non-competitive squad in the program. The all female squad competed at Collegiate cheerleading camps until the mid-1990s. This squad, cheers at every regular season home and post-season neutral site game of men's ice hockey. On occasion they also appear at pep fests and other Golden Gopher sporting events. In general, there are anywhere between 9-15 cheerleaders, usually around 12. They are known for their figure skating abilities and perform on-ice stunts, the complexity of which set this squad apart from other hockey cheerleaders, particularly at the collegiate level. Despite stunting now being somewhat limited, they continue to use modified stunts, figure skating abilities, and uniform selections that critics favor among collegiate squads.

Some Minnesota hockey fans refer to them as the Squad of the Unattainable.

=== Goldy Gopher ===
Goldy Gopher is the mascot for the University of Minnesota-Twin Cities campus and the associated sports teams, known as the Golden Gophers. Goldy competes nationally and was the UCA Mascot National Champion in 2011, 2013, 2017, and 2018.

== In popular culture ==
Members of the 2007-08 University of Minnesota Hockey Cheer Squad portray cheerleaders for fictional high school hockey team in the 2008 horror film Killer Movie, directed by Jeff Fisher and starring Paul Wesley and Kaley Cuoco.
