= Hail! Minnesota =

Anthem of the U.S. state of Minnesota

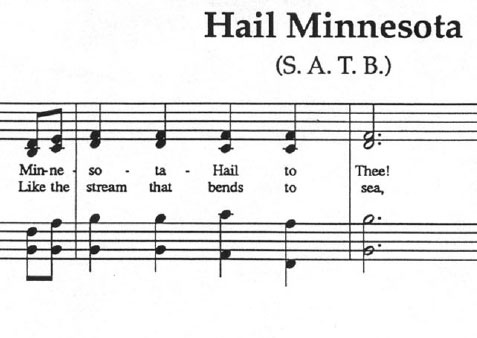
- The beginning of "Hail! Minnesota"'s sheet music
- Regional anthem of Minnesota
- Also known as: "Minnesota"
- Lyrics: Cyrus Northrop, 1904
- Music: Truman Rickard, 1904
- Adopted: 1945; 80 years ago

"Hail! Minnesota" (also simply called "Minnesota" in early years) is the regional anthem (or "state song") of the U.S. state of Minnesota. A variation is used as a school song of the University of Minnesota. It originated at the university in the early 20th century when some students decided to honor their graduating class with a new song. In 1945, the Minnesota State Legislature approved the tune as the state song.

== History ==
The song was first composed by Truman Rickard, a student at the University of Minnesota, in 1904. It was first performed on May 28, Class Day. The song's second verse originally honored the school's president, Cyrus Northrop, who went by the nickname "Prexy". Northrop appreciated the gesture but preferred to have the song reflect the school and state rather than himself. A new second verse was written by Arthur Upson, an editor at the campus newspaper, the Minnesota Daily.

In the next few years, the song gained popularity and was even sung at football games whenever there was a touchdown. However, the slow ballad proved to be incongruous with the atmosphere at an athletic event like that, so it was eventually succeeded in that role by The "Minnesota Rouser." Rickard also went on to write another school song, "Minnesota Fight."

The University of Minnesota Marching Band sings the song at the end of every practice and performance, so Golden Gopher football fans who stay for the band's post-game performance can hear the song. On "Senior Day" (final hockey home game of the season) the Gopher Hockey Pep Band serenades departing seniors after the game.

Older generations of Minnesotan children were taught the song in school, but this practice has waned. However, the song was promoted again as part of the state sesquicentennial celebration in 2008, with the Mahtomedi High School Chamber Singers making an official recording of it in 2006 for the Secretary of State.

== Lyrics ==
=== State version ===
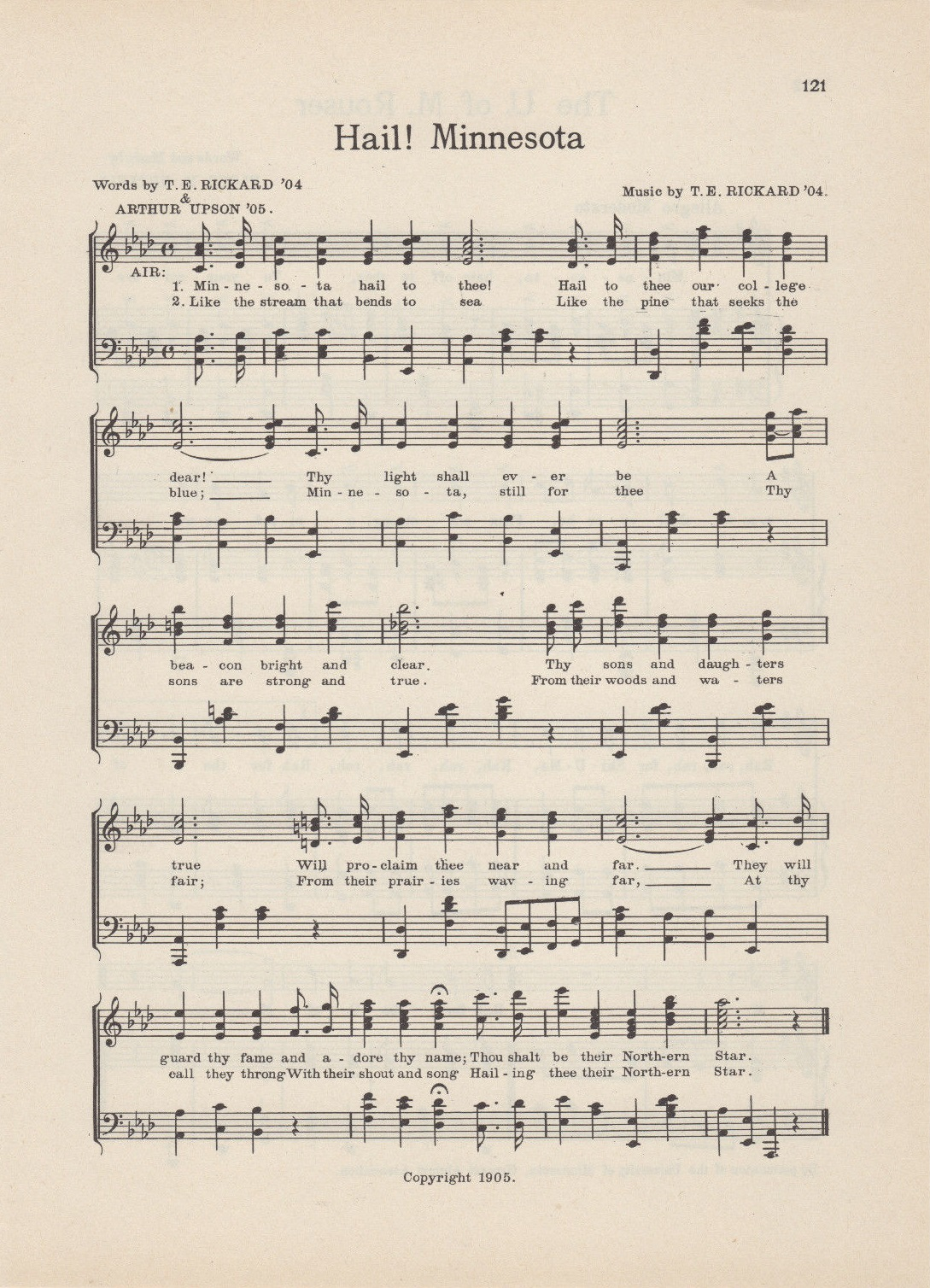
Sheet music for the college version

Minnesota, Hail to Thee,
Hail to Thee, our state so dear,
Thy light shall ever be
A beacon bright and clear.
Thy sons and daughters true
Will proclaim Thee near and far.
They shall guard Thy fame and adore Thy name;
Thou shalt be their Northern Star!

Like the stream that bends to sea,
Like the pine that seeks the blue;
Minnesota, still for Thee
Thy sons are strong and true!
From Thy woods and waters fair,
From Thy prairies waving far.
At Thy call they throng with a shout and song;
Hailing Thee their Northern Star!

=== University version ===
Minnesota, Hail to Thee!
Hail to Thee, our College dear!
Thy light shall ever be
A beacon bright and clear.
Thy sons and daughters true
Will proclaim Thee near and far.
They will guard Thy fame
And adore Thy name;
Thou shalt be their Northern Star!

(Currently, the second verse is same as the state version, although it originally honored the school's president)

Hail to Thee our Prexy, Sire,
Thou hast made us all Thine own,
And our hearts one boon aspire.
That our love may be Thy throne.
Throughout our future years
Naught can e'er Thy memory mar.
We will guard Thy fame
And adore Thy name,
Thou shalt be our Northern Star.
