= Arthur Upson =

American writer

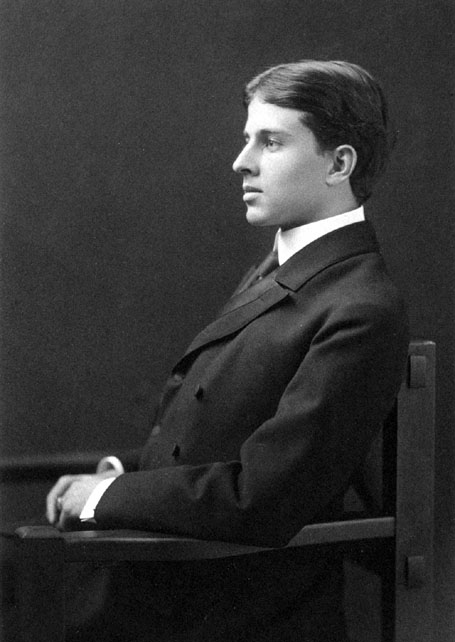
Arthur Upson

Arthur Wheelock Upson (January 10, 1877 – August 14, 1908) was an American poet.

== Early life ==
He was born in Camden, New York, on January 10, 1877, to Spencer Johnson Upson and Julia Claflin. His family moved from New York to Saint Paul, Minnesota, in 1894, with Upson entering the University of Minnesota with the class of 1898. There, he served as editor of the campus newspaper, the Minnesota Daily. While a student at University of Minnesota, he was a member of the Beta Pi chapter of Beta Theta Pi. Unable to complete the requirements for a degree due to his ill health, he was later awarded a degree in 1906 due to his literary success, becoming an instructor there the same year. Upson reworked the song "Hail! Minnesota", at the request of the school's president Cyrus Northrop, the song later becoming the state song of Minnesota and the alma mater of the University of Minnesota.

== Career ==
The Bellman (literary magazine) was almost the first magazine to publish the work of American writer Arthur Upson.

== Death ==
Upson died at age 31, drowning after falling from his boat in Lake Bemidji, Minnesota, on August 14, 1908. His body was found after he had been missing for two days. The boat which he fell from had capsized and had lacked one of its oars. It was suspected that Upson's death was a suicide, as he already attempted suicide only three years before. Upson was mourned as having been a highly promising artist, with the young Sinclair Lewis writing an editorial obituary that exalted Upson, comparing him to a Keats or a Chatterton. His collected poems, edited with an introduction by fellow poet Richard Burton, were published in 1908. Burton also published "an elegy on the death" of Upson in 1910 entitled a Midsummer Memory.

== Bibliography ==
- Westwind Songs (1902)
- Octaves in an Oxford Garden (1902)
- The City: a Poem Drama (1905)
- The Tides of Spring and Other Poems (1907)
- Collected Poems (1909)
