= Amelia Josephine Burr =

American poet

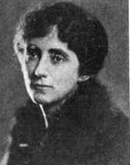
Amelia Josephine Burr, 1921

Amelia Josephine Burr (November 19, 1878 – June 15, 1968) was an American poet. Born in New York City, she was educated at and graduated from Hunter College (New York). She worked for the Red Cross in 1917–18. She married Reverend Carl H. Elmore of Englewood, New Jersey.

== Career ==
She was described as a "popular lyricist, whose work yet flashes with genuine poetic feeling" and was reputed to have traveled widely. A contemporary source commented, "Her adventures in the Orient have colored her work, and with energy and charm she succeeded in getting to know much concerning the natives and their customs wherever she went. Much of her verse must, of course, be classed as balladry, and it is as a balladist that she has gained a wide audience, but, especially in her later work, there is much more than graceful appeal."

She made her "first considerable poetic appearance" in the pages of The Bellman.

== Selected works ==
=== Poetical works ===
- Plays In The Market-Place, 1910
- A Roadside Fire, 1913
- Afterglow, a poem 1913
- In Deep Places, 1914
- Life and Living 1916
- The Silver Trumpet 1918
- Hearts Awake: The Pixy, A play, 1919

The above two volumes relate chiefly to World War I

- A child garden in India, for very little people: Verses 1922
- Little houses: A book of poems 1923
- Selected lyrics 1927

=== Novels ===
- A Dealer in Empire; A Romance 1915
- The Three Fires: A Story of Ceylon 1922

== Sources ==
- The Bookman Anthology of Verse (1922)
- Bleiler, Everett (1948). The Checklist of Fantastic Literature. Chicago: Shasta Publishers. p. 32.
