= Norwood Teague =

American athletic director

Norwood Teague is the former athletic director at the University of Minnesota.

== Early career ==
Teague graduated from the University of North Carolina at Chapel Hill (UNC) in 1988 with a B.A. in political science and later earned a master's degree in sports administration from Ohio University in 1992. At UNC, Teague was a member of Pi Kappa Alpha. He then worked in the athletics departments at the University of Virginia from 1993 to 1998, Arizona State University from 1999 to 2001, and as the associate athletic director for marketing and promotions at North Carolina from 2001 to 2006. In July 2006, Teague was hired as the athletics director at Virginia Commonwealth University.

== University of Minnesota ==
On April 22, 2012, Teague was announced as the sole finalist to succeed Joel Maturi as the University of Minnesota athletics director. He was hired, pending approval by the board of regents, and introduced at a press conference by President Eric W. Kaler the next day. He took over for Joel Maturi as the Gophers' athletics director on June 18, 2012.

He resigned suddenly on August 7, 2015, admitting sexual harassment incidents involving non-student University employees. He was replaced by Mark Coyle in May 2016.
