= Frank Bencriscutto =

- Born: Frank Peter Anthony Bencriscutto; September 21, 1928; Racine, Wisconsin, United States
- Died: August 28, 1997 (aged 68) Roseville, Minnesota, United States
- Occupations: Conductor, saxophonist, composer
- Instrument: Saxophone

Frank Bencriscutto (September 21, 1928 – August 28, 1997), nicknamed "Dr. Ben," was an American conductor and composer of concert band music. Bencriscutto was Director of Bands and Professor of Music at the University of Minnesota for thirty-two years.

== Family ==
Born to Italian immigrant parents in Racine, Wisconsin, Bencriscutto was the ninth of ten children. In 1951, he married Jean Wisner Fischer. The couple had three children.

== Education ==
Bencriscutto earned Bachelor of Music and Master of Music degrees from the University of Wisconsin and a Doctor of Musical Arts degree from the Eastman School of Music. At Eastman, he studied composition with Howard Hanson and Bernard Rogers and played principal alto saxophone in the Eastman Wind Ensemble under Frederick Fennell.

== University of Minnesota ==
Bencriscutto's work as a conductor at the University of Minnesota (1960-1993) led to many honors for his ensembles. As director of the University of Minnesota Marching Band, Bencriscutto instituted the Indoor Marching Band Concert at Northrop Auditorium, an annual tradition that has since been copied by university marching bands nationwide. Many marching band traditions instituted by Bencriscutto continue to this day, including the band's football pre-game "swinging gates" formation performed during Dr. Ben's arrangement of "Battle Hymn of the Republic." This tradition has been ongoing since it debuted in 1961.

In 1969, the conductor led the University of Minnesota Wind Orchestra on a landmark 7-week, 10-city, 27-concert cultural exchange tour in the Soviet Union while Bolshoi Ballet toured the United States. The tour culminated with a presidential command performance in the Rose Garden of the White House and resulted in Dr. Bencriscutto being invited by Dmitri Shostakovich and the Ministry of Culture to be an honored guest of the Soviet Union the following year at the 1970 International Tschaikovsky Competition.

Benscriscutto and The University of Minnesota Concert Band made a tour of mainland China in 1980 as the first American band to perform in the People's Republic of China.

After retiring from the University of Minnesota in 1993, Bencriscutto joined the faculty at the Musashino Academia Musicae in Tokyo, Japan as a visiting professor and conductor of the Wind Ensemble until 1996.

== Professional honors ==
Bencriscutto was elected to the American Bandmasters Association in 1966. His work "Sing a New Song" (1973) won the Neil A. Kjos Memorial Award for the most significant contribution to band literature. He received the Edwin Franko Goldman Award from the American School Band Directors Association in 1993, and in 1997, he was posthumously awarded the Medal of Honor at the Midwest Clinic.

== Composer ==
Active as a composer and arranger, Bencriscutto wrote the majority of his original works for concert bands. Several of his compositions have become standards in the repertoire, including Let the Light Shine, Latina, Serenade for Solo Alto Saxophone and Band, Granite Rock, and Summer in Central Park. As an arranger, Bencriscutto transcribed several orchestral works for band, most notably Profanation from Jeremiah (Symphony No. 1) by Leonard Bernstein. He also arranged many works for the University of Minnesota Marching Band that are still used by the ensemble today. Examples include The Minnesota Rouser, The Royals Rouser, The Minnesota March by John Philip Sousa, Hail! Minnesota, and Battle Hymn of the Republic.

== Compositions ==
A list of original compositions is included below.

=== Concert band ===
- Metamorphosis: Three Episodes for Concert Band (1957)
- Concertino for Tuba and Wind Band (1963)
- Latina, Latin American Dance (1964)
- Lyric Dance (1967)
- Festina (1971)
- Granite Rock (1971)
- The Spirit of Our Land (1972)
- Jazz March: A Brazilian Percussion Feature (1972)
- Sing A New Song - Psalm 96, for Mixed Choir and Band (1973)
- The President's Trio, for Three Trumpets and Band (1973)
- Symphonic Jazz Suite for jazz soloists, jazz-rock combo, and band (1975)
- Lamp Of Liberty (Symbol Of The American Spirit - The Statue Of Liberty) (1976)
- Serenade for Alto Saxophone and Band (1976)
- Dialogue for Clarinet and Band (1978)
- Six Concert Fanfares (1977)
- Let The Light Shine (1978)
- Concerto for Trumpet and Band (1979)
- Escapade For Trombones (1979)
- Concerto Grosso for Saxophone Quartet and Band (1980)
- Jubile (1981)
- Kaleidoscope (1986)
- Visions of Childhood (from Metamorphosis) (1987)
- Pacific Scene (1987)
- Lindbergh Jubilee (1988)
- TM Blues (1991)
- Concertino for Clarinet and Band (1995)
- Centennial Festival Overture (1995)
- Summer In Central Park (1996)

=== Chorus ===
- Sing A New Song - Psalm 96, for Mixed Choir and Band (1973)

=== Chamber ===
- Rondeau for percussion and piano (1959)
- Valse Rondo for solo clarinet and piano (1978)
- Dialogue for solo clarinet and piano (1978)
- Elegy for solo clarinet and piano (1978)
- Concerto grosso for saxophone quartet and piano (1980)
- Suite for flute and piano, bass, drum set (1986)

=== Pedagogical work ===
- Total Musicianship, method books for all musical instruments of a band (1983)
