= Goldy Gopher =

Mascot of the University of Minnesota

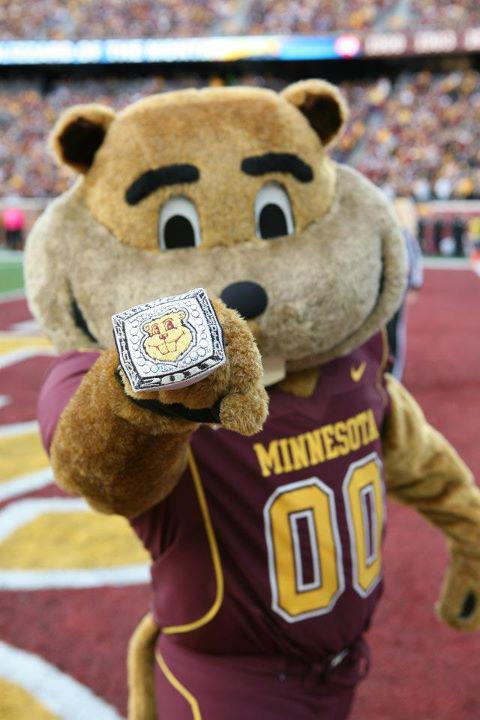
- Goldy Gopher at Huntington Bank Stadium
- University: University of Minnesota
- Conference: Big Ten
- Description: Gopher
- First seen: 1952

Goldy Gopher is the mascot for the University of Minnesota and the associated sports teams, known as the Golden Gophers, as well as a four-time UCA Mascot National Champion (2011, 2013, 2017, and 2018). During the year, Goldy makes over 1000 appearances and is at virtually all home games for University teams, usually wearing the appropriate sporting attire. The mascot is based on the thirteen-lined ground squirrel, colloquially referred to as a “gopher” in Minnesota.

== Origins ==
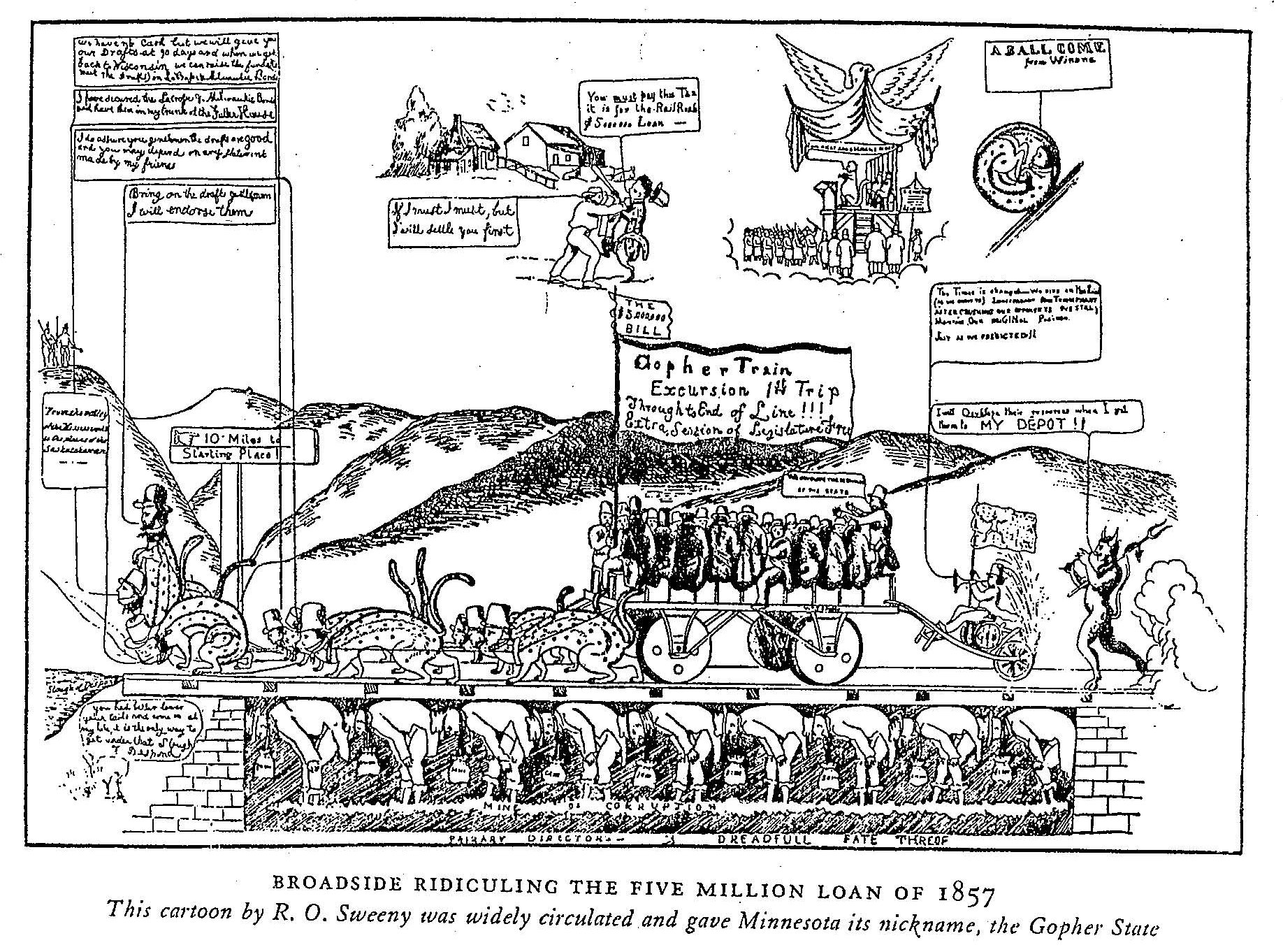
The 1857 political cartoon from which Minnesota derived its nickname, "The Gopher State".

Minnesota became known as the "Gopher State" in 1857, the result of a political cartoon ridiculing the $5 million Railroad Loan which helped open up the West. The cartoon portrayed shifty railroad barons as striped gophers pulling a railroad car carrying the Territorial Legislature toward the "Slough of Despond". The first U of M yearbook bearing the name "Gopher Annual" appeared in 1887.

Minnesota's athletic teams became widely known as the "Gophers" by the 1920s, but it was not until 1934 that Halsey Hall, great Minnesota sportswriter and broadcaster, dubbed Bernie Bierman's all-gold uniformed team "The Golden Gophers". Bierman had chosen the gold color because the football blended in with the uniforms.

The embodiment of the Gopher mascot came to life in 1952 when University of Minnesota assistant bandmaster Jerome Glass bought a fuzzy wool gopher suit with a papier-mâché head and asked one of the band members to climb into it. "Goldy" Gopher (the first name seems to have appeared sometime in the 1960s) became a fixture within the University of Minnesota Marching Band and Pep Band, as each year a band member was chosen to don the suit for that season. Wherever these two bands performed, Goldy was there to glad-hand with the crowd, hug the little kids, and torment the cheerleaders.

During the early 1960s, Goldy was written into the football pre-game and halftime shows with a specific place to be. Limited visibility from within the suit made it difficult to see out, and any of the suit's wearers with glasses would fog up while trying to peer out the mouth hole, as the eyeholes were useless. One benefit during the cold games at Memorial Stadium in November was that Goldy Gopher was one of the few fans that stayed warm.

== Attitude and attire ==
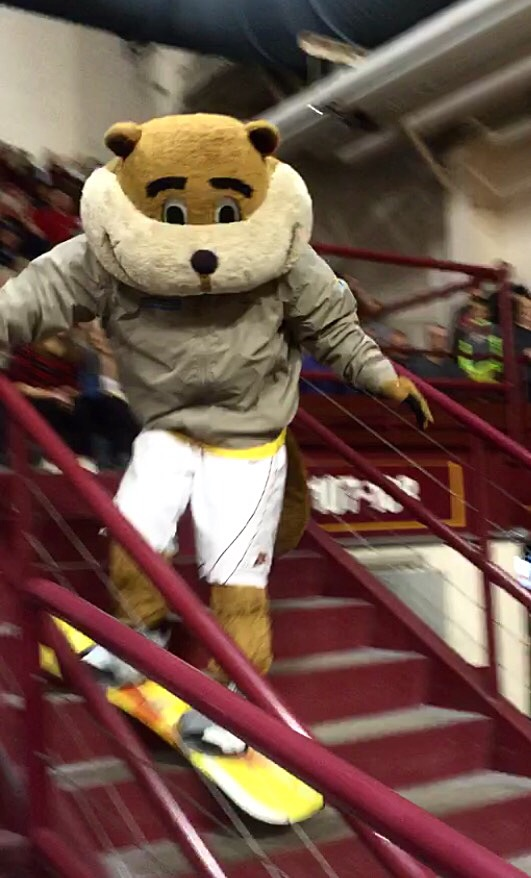
Goldy Gopher snowboarding down a staircase at a women's volleyball game

Each band member who was allowed the joy of being the Gopher developed an individual personality, a unique way of relating to the crowd. The mystique of Goldy Gopher became a tradition that absolutely prohibited removal of the head while in public, maintaining an illusion for the younger children that Goldy Gopher was a real live huggable animal.

From 1952 until 1990, the Gopher appearing at U of M sports events was a member of the Marching Band, and a symbiosis developed through the years that on more than one occasion kept Goldy out of trouble. With a propensity for attracting tail-pulling kids, Goldy relied on the band to save the gopher from their clutches. And when the opposing team's cheerleaders or band members managed to “kidnap” the unfortunate rodent (a Big Ten tradition), band members would come to the rescue.

In the late 1980s the U of M Athletic Department began to make use of Goldy at an ever-increasing number of events, and held University-wide tryouts to secure a number of students who could cover the busy schedule. The Athletic Department's Spirit Squad officially took charge of Goldy in 1992.

A signature move of Goldy's is head spinning, usually brought on by crowd chants of "Spin your head!", a tradition started at hockey games in the early 1990s. This is often followed by chants of "Spin your body!", and occasionally "Spin your tail!", with Goldy abiding and spinning the respective body parts. 1990s hockey games also sometimes featured Goldy sledding down the entirety of the Mariucci Arena staircase, nearly 30 rows. The tradition has been reigned in since then for safety concerns, but Goldy can still be found sledding and snowboarding from reduced heights.

The style of the gopher suit changed many times through the years, sometimes by chance, sometimes by design. Until the early 1970s, the head was narrow and pointy-nosed, reminiscent of the real animal. Then in 1972, Goldy suddenly grew chubby cheeks and a wider, forward-looking face, almost cherubic in appearance. The gopher of the 1970s and early 1980s was comparable in appearance to a teddy bear, a favorite of children and grandmothers. For a brief period in 1985, a fierce-looking “mega-rodent“ appeared, with a barrel chest, clown feet and sinister eyes. This look didn't last long, and Goldy soon again became a lovable, friendly character.

The students that portray Goldy maintain anonymity throughout their tenure. They are also recognized as student athletes due to their vigorous schedule and amount of work that goes into it. They are considered a part of the "Spirit Squad" at the University of Minnesota, which encompasses the cheerleading and dance teams.

== Design ==
Goldy’s first official design was made in the 1940s by sports merchandiser George Grooms, featuring a smiling "gopher" wearing a hat with the letter M on it. Grooms, while driving to the University of Minnesota from Iowa, stopped at a rest stop and sketched what he thought were gophers. He presented the drawing to U of M bookstore manager Harold Smith, who loved it. Only after the image was put into production did it become realized that the animal drawn was actually a chipmunk.

In the 1950s, Goldy's look became more animated. In the 1960s and 1970s, Goldy became more slim and simplistic, and was often drawn wearing sporting equipment. In 1979, the University hired Bill Stein to draw a new look for Goldy, which consisted of the mascot waving and wearing a shirt. Some commented that this drawing of Goldy wasn't fierce enough as a college mascot, and in 1985, a new version of Goldy was drawn by Steve Wanvig, who was asked by the University to make a more aggressive look. This variation of Goldy was a buff gopher with a fierce expression; depicted to be wearing a sweater and charging. Students who preferred the old design formed a group called Save Our Wimp, who championed for the previous drawing's more mild design. Responding to the criticism, the University's athletics department asked Wanvig in 1986 to tone down Goldy, who was then drawn in the same style, but without huge muscles and with a friendlier expression. This version of Goldy has been the one used since.

== National competitions ==
=== UCA Mascot National Championships ===
Goldy also competes in the UCA Mascot National Championships and regularly makes the top 3. Goldy’s first win was in 2011 and followed up with championships in 2013, 2017, and 2018.

UCA National championship results
Year	Place
2007	3rd
2008	4th
2009	3rd
2010	3rd
2011	1st
2012	5th
2013	1st
2014	2nd
2015	3rd
2016	2nd
2017	1st
2018	1st
2019	2nd
2020	5th
2021	N/A
2022	4th
2023	5th
2024	5th
2026	2nd

=== Capital One ===
Goldy was nominated to and made the 2004, 2007, and 2010 Capital One All-American Mascot Team. In 2007 Goldy finished second to Zippy from the University of Akron.

== Goldy Gopher statue ==
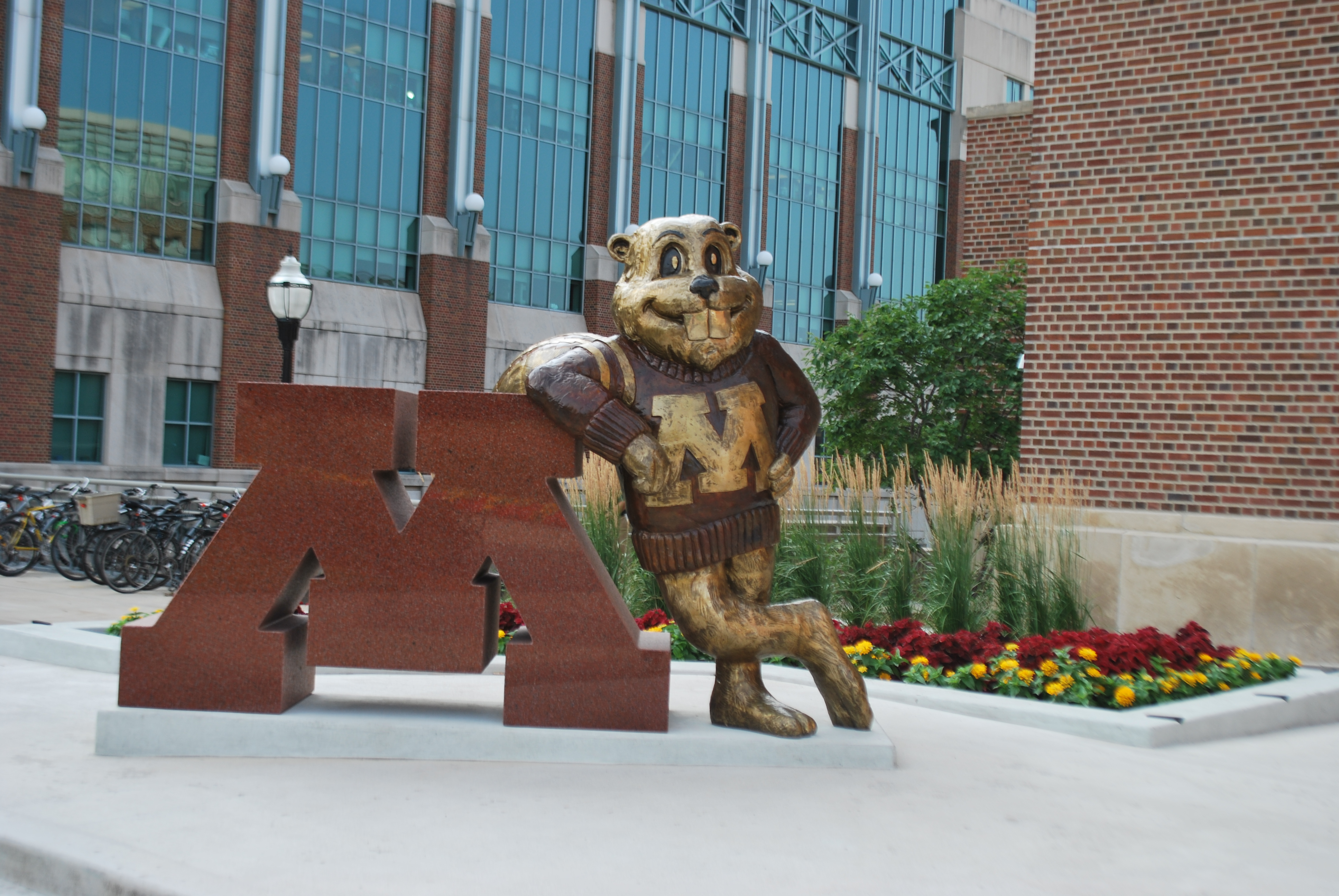
The Goldy Gopher statue in front of Coffman Memorial Union

Due to the contributions from students, faculty, family, alumni, and friends, the University of Minnesota's Student Union was able to fund the creation of an all bronze statue of Goldy the Gopher. This was a controversial issue for some in the university community because of the rising costs of tuition and the university's concurrent appeals to the state legislature for a tuition freeze. The goal of the statue, located in the front of Coffman Memorial Union, was to promote school spirit and start new traditions. The University of Minnesota Administration hopes the iconic symbol will help students interact with the spirit and new traditions involving Goldy the Gopher. The statue is 6 feet 3 inches (1.91 m) tall and made of bronze granite. Next to the statue is a solid granite "M" that is 63 inches in width, 24 Inches in depth, and 48 inches in height (160 x 61 x 122 cm). It was sculpted by Nicholas Legeros, who is a Minnesota graduate from the fine arts academy. He has sculpted many pieces for the Twin Cities Metro area. The total cost of the statue was $95,000.

On Monday, September 23, 2013, the Goldy statue was unveiled during the homecoming kickoff at noon - which happened to be Goldy Gopher's birthday. Governor Mark Dayton declared this day Goldy Gopher Day to create a new tradition for the students. Supposedly if someone was to rub Goldy's front teeth, it will bring them good luck.
