= Mark Coyle =

American athletic director (born 1969)

Current position
- Title: Athletic director
- Team: Minnesota
- Conference: Big Ten

Biographical details
- Born: Waterloo, Iowa, U.S.
- Education: Drake University; Florida State University

Playing career

football
- 1987–1991: Drake

Administrative career (AD unless noted)
- 2001–2005: Minnesota (associate AD)
- 2006–2011: Kentucky (deputy AD)
- 2011–2015: Boise State
- 2015–2016: Syracuse
- 2016–present: Minnesota

Mark Coyle is the 23rd director of athletics at the University of Minnesota, replacing Norwood Teague. He resigned as the athletics director at Syracuse University in May 2016 after spending only 11 months with the Syracuse Orange.

Prior to this position, Coyle was the athletics director at Boise State University (2011–15), a deputy athletics director at the University of Kentucky (2006–11), and an associate athletics director at Minnesota (2001–05).

== Career ==
At Syracuse, two of his programs won national titles and five won ACC championships. Prior to that, at Boise State, 18 Broncos teams posted record GPAs on the way to claiming 12 conference championships.

At Minnesota, he received a multi-year contract extension running through June 2026.

== Personal life ==
Coyle grew up in Waterloo, Iowa and graduated from the Columbus High School in 1987. He started wide receiver for the Sailors and was on the 1986 State Football 3A Championship team. He played football for Drake University, where he graduated with a bachelor’s degree in English in 1991. He earned his master's degree in teaching from Drake in 1992 and a master's degree in sports administration from Florida State University in 1993.

Coyle and his wife Krystan have three children, Grace, Nicholas and Benjamin and live in St. Paul.
