= The Bellman (literary magazine) =

20th American magazine

The Bellman was a 20th-century literary magazine based in Minneapolis Minnesota. The magazine was published from 1906 to 1919 and it was considered to be one of the best literary periodicals.

== Background ==
The Bellman Company began publishing the magazine in 1906. It was edited by William Crowell Edgar.

== History ==
In 1918 editor William Stanley Braithwaite writing for the Anthology of Magazine Verse stated that the magazine was "the best edited and most influential periodical published." he went on to say that it was widely read in the east. It was almost the first magazine to publish the work of American writer Arthur Upson. American poet Amelia Josephine Burr made her "first considerable poetic appearance" in the pages of The Bellman.

In 1919 Minnesota based Western Magazine reported on the suspension of The Bellman. They stated that The Bellman had been, "the best product, along literary lines". In 1920 a book was published called The Bellman Book of Verse, the book included the best poems which had been published in the magazine.

== See also ==
- List of literary magazines
- Literary fiction
- Creative nonfiction
- Short story
- Anthology
- Poetry
- Non-fiction
