= Our Minnesota =

Song by Marion L. Bassett
- Released: -1925

"Our Minnesota" was one of two winners of a 1925 contest to find an additional fight song for the University of Minnesota. Despite the popularity of the Minnesota Rouser, the Minnesota Union offered a hundred-dollar prize for the best college music and lyrics. Marion L. Bassett, a University of Minnesota English major, wrote "Our Minnesota" as part of an assignment for a music class. The judging committee could not decide between Bassett's entry and Truman Rickard's "Minnesota! Let's Go!" (later known as "Minnesota Fight") and split the prize between the two. "Our Minnesota" continues to be performed at Minnesota Golden Gopher athletic events.

== Lyrics ==
On, you Gophers! You fighting Gophers!
Break that line and win this game!
Fight it thru, men, win the Big Ten,
Make them sorry that they came!
For the glory, of Minnesota!
For the honor that's her due!
For Maroon and Gold, be warriors bold!
For Dear Old "U"!
