= Minnesota Golden Gophers =

Intercollegiate sports teams of the University of Minnesota

- University: University of Minnesota
- Nickname: Golden Gophers
- NCAA: Division I (FBS)
- Conference: Big Ten (primary); WCHA (women’s ice hockey)
- Athletic director: Mark Coyle
- Location: Minneapolis, Minnesota
- Varsity teams: 21 (9 men's; 12 women's)
- Football stadium: Huntington Bank Stadium
- Basketball arena: The Barn
- Ice hockey arena: 3M Arena at Mariucci (men); Ridder Arena (women)
- Baseball stadium: Siebert Field; U.S. Bank Stadium (February and March, 2017–present)
- Soccer stadium: Elizabeth Lyle Robbie Stadium
- Other venues: Maturi Pavilion
- Colors: Maroon and gold
- Mascot: Goldy Gopher
- Fight song: Minnesota Rouser
- Website: gophersports.com

Big Ten logo in Minnesota's colors

The Minnesota Golden Gophers (commonly shortened to Gophers) are the college sports teams of the University of Minnesota. The university fields a total of 21 (9 men's, 12 women's) teams in both men's and women's sports and competes in the Big Ten Conference.

The Gophers women's ice hockey team is a six-time NCAA champion and seven-time national champion. In women's ice hockey, the Gophers belong to the Western Collegiate Hockey Association. In all other sports, they belong to the Big Ten Conference. Most of the facilities that the teams use for training and competitive play are located on the East Bank of the Minneapolis campus. There are arenas for men's and women's basketball (Williams Arena) as well as ice hockey (Mariucci Arena and Ridder Arena). The Gopher football team began playing at Huntington Bank Stadium in September 2009. The women's soccer team plays on the St. Paul campus in the Elizabeth Lyle Robbie Stadium.

The Cheerleaders and the Dance Team are also part of the university's athletic department; they are present at events for basketball, ice hockey, and football, and compete for UCA/UDA national titles in the winter. The University of Minnesota spirit squad was the first as sideline cheerleading was invented at the U of M, and it prides itself in being one of the largest spirit squads in the country. The U of M spirit squad currently consists of three cheerleading teams (all girl, coed, and small coed), a dance team, Goldy Gopher, and a unique ice hockey cheerleading team. The dance team won its 19th national title in 2019.

During the 2006–07 academic year, the Golden Gophers wrestling team won the NCAA national championship and the Big Ten team title. The Golden Gophers also won conference championships in men's ice hockey, men's golf, women's rowing, men's swimming and diving, and women's indoor track and field.

== Sports sponsored ==
Men's sports	Women's sports
Baseball	Basketball
Basketball	Cross country
Cross country	Golf
Football	Gymnastics
Golf	Ice hockey
Ice hockey	Rowing
Swimming and diving	Soccer
Track and field	Softball
Wrestling	Swimming and diving
	Tennis
	Track and field^{†}
	Volleyball
† – Track and field includes both indoor and outdoor

=== Baseball ===
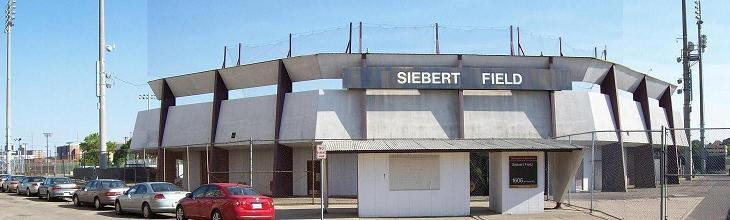
Siebert Field, baseball stadium

- National Championships (3):

1956, 1960, 1964

- NCAA Tournament Appearances (32):

1956, 1958, 1959, 1960, 1964, 1968, 1969, 1970, 1973, 1974, 1976, 1977, 1981, 1982, 1985, 1987, 1988, 1991, 1992, 1993, 1994, 1998, 1999, 2000, 2001, 2003, 2004, 2007, 2009, 2010, 2016, 2018

- Big Ten Regular Season Championships (24):

1933, 1935, 1956, 1958, 1959, 1960, 1964, 1968, 1969, 1970, 1973, 1974, 1977, 1982, 1985, 1988, 1992, 2000, 2002, 2003, 2004, 2010, 2016, 2018

- Big Ten Conference Tournament Championships (9):

1982, 1985, 1988, 1992, 1998, 2001, 2004, 2010, 2018

=== Men's basketball ===
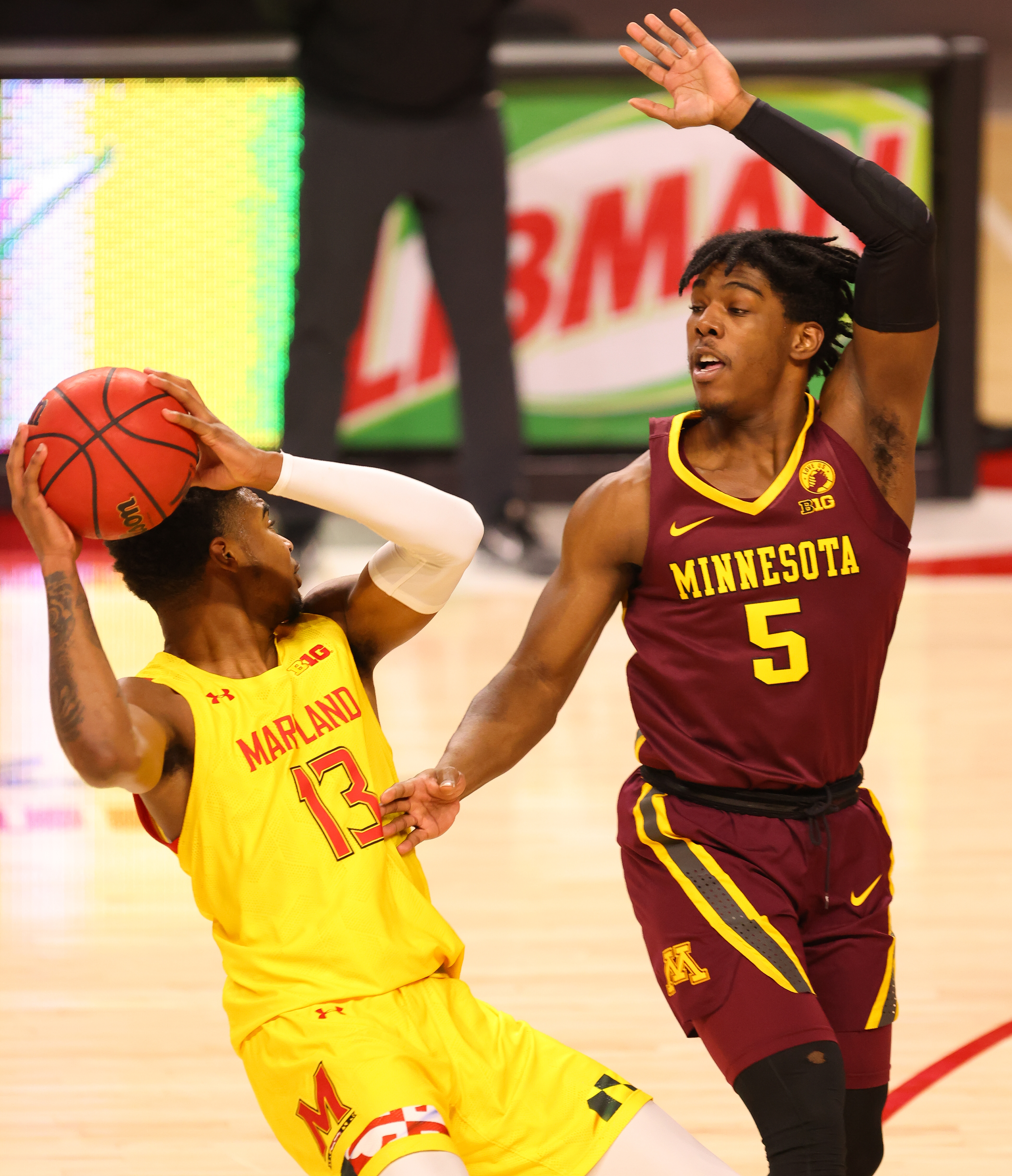
Minnesota v Maryland game in 2021

- Big Ten Regular Season Championships (8):

1906, 1907, 1911, 1917, 1919, 1937, 1972, 1982

- NCAA Tournament Appearances (10):

1972, 1982, 1989, 1990, 2005, 2009, 2010, 2013, 2017, 2019

- Sweet 16 Appearances (3):

1982, 1989, 1990

- Elite Eight Appearances (1):

1990

- NIT Appearances (12):

1973, 1980, 1981, 1983, 1992, 1993, 2001, 2002, 2003, 2008, 2012, 2014

- NIT Championships (2):

1993, 2014

Note: A 1997 Big Ten regular season championship, NCAA Tournament appearances in 1994, 1995, 1997 (Final Four), and 1999, as well as NIT appearances in 1996 and 1998 (Championship) were vacated due to NCAA sanctions.

=== Women's basketball ===
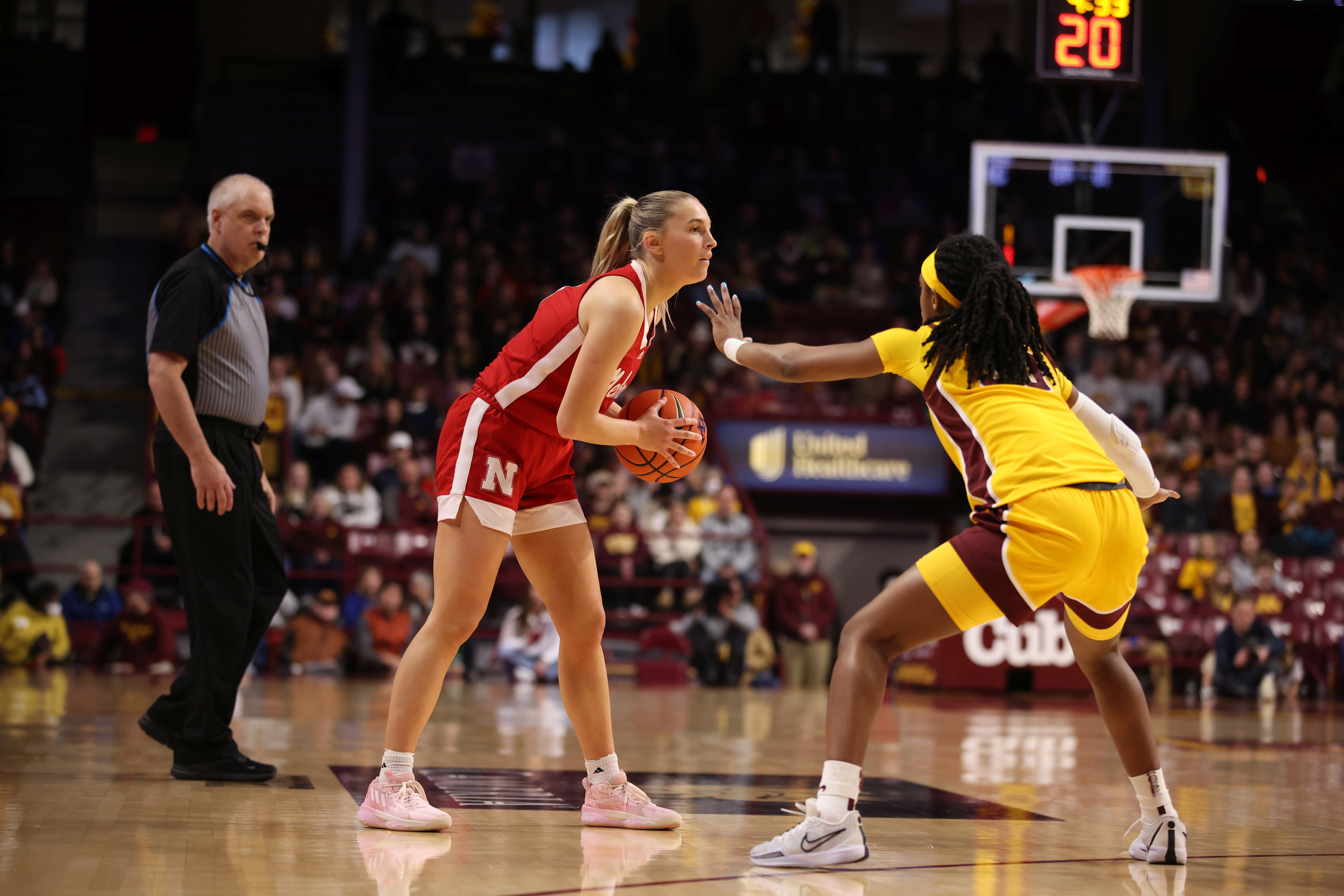
Minnesota v Nebraska game, 2024

- NCAA Tournament Appearances (11):

1994, 2002, 2003, 2004, 2005, 2006, 2008, 2009,
2015, 2018, 2026

- Sweet 16 Appearances (4):

2003, 2004, 2005, 2026

- Elite Eight Appearances (1):

2004

- Final Four Appearances (1):

2004

=== Men's cross country ===
- Big Ten Team Championships (4):

1909, 1914, 1964, 1969

=== Women's cross country ===
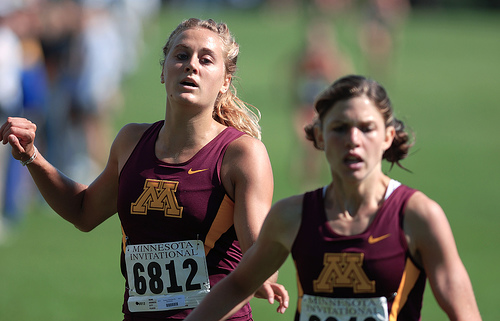
Women's Cross Country Team runs the OZ invitational on the Les Bolstad Golf Course.

- Big Ten Team Championships (2):

2007, 2008

=== Football ===
- National Championships (7):

1904, 1934, 1935, 1936, 1940, 1941, 1960

- Big Ten Conference Championships (18):

1900, 1903, 1904, 1906, 1909, 1910, 1911, 1915, 1927, 1933, 1934, 1935, 1937, 1938, 1940, 1941, 1960, 1967

- Intercollegiate Athletic Association of the Northwest Championships (2):

1892, 1893

- Bowl Games (20):

Citrus Bowl – 2015
Duke's Mayo Bowl - 2025
Guaranteed Rate Bowl - 2021
Hall of Fame Classic –1977
Holiday Bowl – 2016
Independence Bowl – 1985
Insight Bowl – 2006, 2008, 2009
Liberty Bowl – 1986
MicronPC.com Bowl – 2000
Music City Bowl – 2002, 2004, 2005
Outback Bowl – 2020
Pinstripe Bowl - 2022
Quick Lane Bowl – 2015, 2018
Meineke Car Care Bowl of Texas – 2012
Quick Lane Bowl - 2023
Rose Bowl – 1961, 1962
Sun Bowl – 1999, 2003
Texas Bowl – 2013

- Bowl game victories: 1962 Rose Bowl, 1985 Independence Bowl, 2002 Music City Bowl, 2003 Sun Bowl, 2004 Music City Bowl, 2015 Quick Lane Bowl, 2016 Holiday Bowl, 2018 Quick Lane Bowl, 2020 Outback Bowl, 2021 Guaranteed Rate Bowl, 2022 Pinstripe Bowl, 2023 Quick Lane Bowl, 2025 Duke's Mayo Bowl

==== Traveling trophies ====
- The Little Brown Jug – Accidentally left in Minnesota back in 1903 by Michigan coach Fielding H. Yost, it is painted with the victories of the two teams.
- Floyd of Rosedale – Since 1935 the Gophers and the Iowa Hawkeyes have fought to win this bronze pig. The Gophers won the 2010 and 2011 match up for the pig, upsetting the favored Hawkeyes at TCF Bank Stadium.
- Paul Bunyan's Axe – Minnesota and the Wisconsin Badgers have passed this trophy back and forth since 1948, although it records the two teams' encounters since 1890.
- Governor's Victory Bell – The bell was created to commemorate the 1993 entrance of Penn State's Nittany Lions into the Big Ten.
- $5-Bits-O-Broken-Chair Trophy – The newest of the five trophies. From a 2014 exchange on Twitter, Goldy Gopher created a trophy with a parody account of the then coach of Nebraska Bo Pelini.

=== Golf ===
Men's golf

- National Championships (1):

2002

- Individual National Champions (2):

1944 – Louis Lick
1998 – James McLean

- Big Ten Team Championships (8):

1929, 1938, 1963, 1972, 2002, 2003, 2007 (co-champions), 2014

Women's golf

- Big Ten Team Championships (1):

1989

=== Gymnastics ===
Men's gymnastics

- Big Ten Team Championships (21):

1903, 1907, 1910, 1925, 1936, 1938, 1940, 1947, 1948, 1949, 1976, 1977, 1978, 1979, 1980, 1982, 1984, 1990, 1991, 1992, 1995

Women's gymnastics

- Big Ten Team Championships (5):

1988, 1989, 1991, 1998, 2006

=== Men's ice hockey ===
- National Championships (2 pre-NCAA, 5 NCAA):

1929, 1940, 1974, 1976, 1979, 2002, 2003

- WCHA Regular Season Championships (14):

1953, 1954, 1970, 1975, 1981, 1983, 1988, 1989, 1992, 1997, 2006, 2007, 2012, 2013

- Big Ten Regular Season Championships (7):

2014, 2015, 2016, 2017, 2022, 2023, 2025

- Big Ten Tournament Championships (2):

2015, 2021

- WCHA Tournament Championships (14):

1961, 1971, 1974, 1975, 1976, 1979, 1980, 1981, 1993, 1994, 1996, 2003, 2004, 2007

- NCAA Frozen Four Appearances (22):

1953, 1954, 1961, 1971, 1974, 1975, 1976, 1979, 1981, 1983, 1986, 1987, 1988, 1989, 1994, 1995, 2002, 2003, 2005, 2012, 2014, 2023

=== Women's ice hockey ===
- National Championships (7):

2000 (AWCHA), 2004, 2005, 2012, 2013, 2015, 2016

- WCHA Regular Season Championships (8):

2001, 2002, 2004, 2005, 2009, 2010, 2013, 2014

- WCHA Tournament Championships (7):

2002, 2004, 2005, 2012, 2013, 2014, 2015

- NCAA Frozen Four Appearances (15):

2002, 2003, 2004, 2005, 2006, 2009, 2010, 2012, 2013, 2014, 2015, 2016, 2017, 2018, 2019

=== Women's rowing ===
- Big Ten Championships (1):

2007

- NCAA Champions in V2

2007

=== Women's soccer ===
- Big Ten Championships (4):

1995, 1997, 2008, 2016

=== Softball ===
- Big Ten Regular Season Championships (4):

1986, 1988, 1991, 2017

- Big Ten Tournament Championships (5):

1999, 2014, 2016, 2017, 2018

- Women's College World Series appearances (3):

1976, 1978, 2019

=== Spirit Squads ===
Dance Team

- National Championships (13):

2003, 2004, 2005, 2006, 2010, 2011, 2012, 2013, 2014, 2015, 2016, 2017, 2019

=== Swimming ===
Men's swimming

- Big Ten Team Championships (9):

1922, 1926, 1996, 1998, 2001, 2002, 2004, 2005, 2007

Women's swimming

- Big Ten Team Championships (7):

1999, 2000, 2008, 2012, 2013, 2014, 2015

=== Men's tennis ===
- Big Ten Team Championships (15):

1910, 1911, 1912, 1918, 1932, 1933, 1981, 1984, 1986, 1989, 1992, 1993, 1994, 1995, 2015

=== Track and field ===
==== Men's track ====
Outdoor track and field

- National Championships (1):

1948

- Big Ten Team Championships (6):

1949, 1968, 1998, 1999, 2003, 2009, 2010

Indoor track and field

- Big Ten Team Championships (4):

1998, 2009, 2010, 2011

==== Women's track ====
Outdoor track and field

- Big Ten Team Championships (3):

2006, 2016, 2018

Indoor track and field

- Big Ten Team Championships (4):

2007, 2008, 2009, 2018

=== Volleyball ===
- Big Ten Championships (3):

2002, 2015, 2018

- NCAA Tournament Appearances (21):

1989, 1993, 1996, 1997, 1999, 2000, 2001, 2002, 2003, 2004, 2005, 2006, 2007, 2008, 2009, 2010, 2011, 2012, 2013, 2015, 2016, 2017, 2018

- Sweet 16 Appearances (16):

1989, 1993, 1999, 2000, 2001, 2002, 2003, 2004, 2006, 2009, 2010, 2011, 2012, 2013, 2015, 2016

- Final Four Appearances (5):

2003, 2004, 2009, 2015, 2016

=== Wrestling ===
- National Championships (3):

2001, 2002, 2007

- Big Ten Team Championships (12):

1910, 1912, 1913, 1941, 1957, 1959, 1999, 2001, 2002, 2003, 2006, 2007

== Notable non varsity sports ==
=== Rugby ===
Minnesota rugby plays Division I college rugby in the Big Ten Universities conference against traditional Big Ten rivals such as Wisconsin and Iowa. Minnesota qualified for the national playoffs in 2008, and finished the 2008 season ranked 7th in the nation. Some of Minnesota's games have been well attended by fans, with the team drawing as many as 6,000 fans to watch the team play at TCF Bank Stadium.

== Traditions ==
=== The "Golden" Gophers ===
The University Mascot is derived from a nickname for the state of Minnesota, "The Gopher State." The original design was based on the thirteen-lined ground squirrel. The state nickname derives from a political cartoon by R. O. Sweeny, published as a broadside in 1858. The cartoon depicted state legislators as gophers dragging the state in the wrong direction. The nickname was associated with the university as early as the publication of the first yearbook in 1888, which was titled "The Gopher". Other early yearbooks included depictions of gophers as well, and the University of Minnesota football coach Clarence Spears officially named the football team the Gophers in 1926. After the radio announcer Halsey Hall began referring to the team as the Golden Gophers due to the color of their uniforms, the team was renamed under coach Bernie Bierman.

=== School songs ===
School songs for the university include Minnesota Rouser, Minnesota March, Go Gopher Victory, Our Minnesota, Minnesota Fight, Hail! Minnesota, and the Battle Hymn of the Republic.

== Notable athletes and coaches ==
=== Baseball ===
- John Anderson
- Harry Elliott
- Brent Gates
- Jack Hannahan
- Mark Merila
- Paul Molitor
- Denny Neagle
- Greg Olson
- Glen Perkins
- Robb Quinlan
- Dick Siebert – coach
- Terry Steinbach
- Dave Winfield (also played basketball at Minnesota)
- Dan Wilson

=== Basketball ===
==== Men's ====
- Ron Behagen – Former National Basketball Association (NBA) player
- Walter Bond – Former NBA player, and motivational speaker
- Randy Breuer – Former NBA player
- Jim Brewer (basketball) – Former NBA player
- Willie Burton – Former NBA player
- Archie Clark – Former NBA player
- Louis 'Doc' Cooke, coach (1897–1924)
- Bud Grant – Former NBA player, National Football League (NFL) player and longtime Hall of Fame head coach of the Minnesota Vikings
- Clem Haskins – coach
- Lou Hudson – Former NBA player
- Kris Humphries – Former NBA player
- Sam Jacobson – Former NBA player
- Bobby Jackson – NBA player
- Mark Landsberger – Former NBA player
- Voshon Lenard – Former NBA player
- Kevin McHale – Naismith Memorial Basketball Hall of Famer and former President of Basketball Operations/head coach of the Houston Rockets
- Mark Olberding – Former NBA player
- Daniel Oturu (born 1999) – basketball player for Hapoel Tel Aviv of the Israeli Basketball Premier League; formerly NBA player
- Joel Przybilla – Former NBA player
- Flip Saunders – Former NBA head coach
- Tubby Smith – Former head coach
- John Thomas – Former NBA player
- Mychal Thompson – Former NBA player
- Trent Tucker – Former NBA player
- Ray Williams (basketball) – Former NBA player
- Trevor Winter– Former NBA player

==== Women's ====
- Janel McCarville – Former WNBA player for the Minnesota Lynx, New York Liberty, and Charlotte Sting
- Lindsay Whalen – Naismith Memorial Basketball Hall of Famer, current Gopher's Women's Basketball Head Coach, and former WNBA player for the Minnesota Lynx and Connecticut Sun
- Linda Hill-MacDonald – Former head coach
- Rachel Banham - WNBA Player for the Minnesota Lynx
- Amanda Zahui B. - WNBA Player for the Los Angeles Sparks

=== Football ===
==== Players ====
- Asad Abdul-Khaliq – Quarterback, Chicago Rush
- Dominique Barber – Safety, Houston Texans
- Marion Barber Jr. – Former National Football League (NFL) running back
- Marion Barber III – Running back, Chicago Bears
- Bert Baston – All-American, elected to the College Football Hall of Fame in 1954. Awarded Navy Cross in World War I for extraordinary heroism.
- Bobby Bell – Pro Football Hall of Famer
- Phil Bengtson – Former NFL head coach
- Bernie Bierman – Member of the College Football Hall of Fame
- McKinley Boston – Former NFL Defensive end/Linebacker
- Jack Brewer – Safety, Arizona Cardinals
- Win Brockmeyer – Former high school football head coach
- Tom Brown- 1960 Outland Trophy winner, member of the College Football Hall of Fame
- Gino Cappelletti – Former American Football League (AFL) Wide receiver/Placekicker, AFL all-time leading scorer
- Tyrone Carter – Defensive back, San Diego Chargers, 1999 Jim Thorpe Award winner
- Tony Dungy – Former NFL safety for Pittsburgh Steelers, former head coach of the Indianapolis Colts & first African-American head coach to win a Super Bowl championship (Super Bowl XLI)
- Mark Dusbabek – Former NFL Linebacker
- Carl Eller – Pro Football Hall of Famer
- Greg Eslinger – Center, Denver Broncos, 2005 Outland Trophy and Rimington Trophy winner
- George Gibson – Former NFL offensive guard and head coach
- Paul Giel – Member of the College Football Hall of Fame; also was Minnesota's athletic director from 1972 to 1988 and played Major League Baseball
- Bud Grant – Pro Football Hall of Famer & Canadian Football Hall of Fame
- Ben Hamilton – Offensive guard, Denver Broncos
- Ed Hawthorne – Defensive tackle, Miami Dolphins
- Mike Hohensee – Head coach, Chicago Rush
- Herb Joesting – Member of the College Football Hall of Fame
- Rhys Lloyd – Kicker, Carolina Panthers
- Bob McNamara – Former Running Back, Winnipeg Blue Bombers & Denver Broncos
- John McGovern, College Football Hall of Fame, quarterback
- Laurence Maroney – Running back, Denver Broncos
- Bobby Marshall – One of the first two African-Americans to play in the NFL, member of the College Football Hall of Fame
- Karl Mecklenburg – Former NFL linebacker
- Willie Middlebrooks – Defensive back, Toronto Argonauts
- Bronko Nagurski – Pro Football Hall of Famer (charter member), member of the College Football Hall of Fame
- Leo Nomellini – Pro Football Hall of Famer
- Derek Rackley – Tight end, Atlanta Falcons
- Darrell Reid – Defensive tackle, Indianapolis Colts
- Karon Riley – Defensive end, Washington Redskins
- Charlie Sanders – tight end, member of the Pro Football Hall of Fame
- Cory Sauter – Former NFL quarterback
- Jeff Schuh – Retired Linebacker
- Mark Setterstrom – Offensive guard, St. Louis Rams
- Bruce Smith – 1941 Heisman Trophy winner, member of the College Football Hall of Fame
- Sandy Stephens – First African-American major-college All-American quarterback
- Thomas Tapeh – Former NFL fullback
- Ryan Thelwell – Wide Receiver, BC Lions
- Darrell Thompson – Former NFL running back
- Rick Upchurch – Former NFL wide receiver
- Ben Utecht – Tight end, Tennessee Titans
- Bud Wilkinson – Member of the College Football Hall of Fame
- Jeff Wright – Former Minnesota Vikings Defensive back
- Eric Decker – Denver Broncos
- Marcus Sherels – Minnesota Vikings Cornerback/Punt Returner
- Simoni Lawrence – Minnesota Vikings linebacker

==== Coaches ====
- Bernie Bierman
- Tim Brewster
- Fritz Crisler
- Pudge Heffelfinger
- Wesley Fesler
- George Hauser
- Lou Holtz
- Jerry Kill
- Glen Mason
- William H. Spaulding
- Clarence Spears
- Jim Wacker
- Murray Warmath
- Henry L. Williams

=== Golf ===
- Tom Lehman
- James McLean

=== Gymnastics ===
- Newt Loken
- Joey Ray
- Marie Roethlisberger
- John Roethlisberger

=== Hockey ===
==== Men's ====
- Wendell Anderson
- Keith Ballard
- Kellen Briggs
- Herb Brooks
- Aaron Broten
- Neal Broten
- Kris Chucko
- Ben Clymer
- Mike Crowley
- Alex Goligoski
- Tim Harrer
- Steve Janaszak
- Bob Johnson
- Phil Kessel
- Trent Klatt
- Reed Larson
- Nick Leddy
- Jordan Leopold
- Don Lucia
- John Mariucci
- Paul Martin
- John Mayasich
- Joe Micheletti
- Pat Micheletti
- Lou Nanne
- Ryan Potulny
- Johnny Pohl
- Robb Stauber
- Jeff Taffe
- Thomas Vanek
- Phil Verchota
- Blake Wheeler
- Doug Woog

==== Women's ====
- Winny Brodt
- Natalie Darwitz
- Courtney Kennedy
- Gisele Marvin
- Noora Raty
- Jenny Schmidgall-Potter
- Krissy Wendell

=== Swimming ===
- Steve Jackman (born 1941)
- Yoav Meiri (born 1975), Israeli Olympic swimmer
- Justin Mortimer
- Bar Soloveychik (born 2000), Israeli swimmer

=== Track and field ===
==== Women's ====
- Gabriele Grunewald

==== Men's ====
- Hassan Mead
- Buddy Edelen

=== Wrestling ===
- Shelton Benjamin — professional wrestler, 36–6 record in two seasons with the Gophers.
- Verne Gagne – NCAA champion, owner of the defunct American Wrestling Association and its former heavyweight champion (10 times), member of Professional Wrestling Hall of Fame, and several others.
- Cole Konrad – 2 time undefeated, NCAA individual champion at 285 lbs; current mixed martial artist and the former Bellator Heavyweight Champion
- Nik Lentz, wrestler; current mixed martial artist for the Ultimate Fighting Championship (featherweight)
- Brock Lesnar – Former UFC Heavyweight Champion and current WWE champion.
- Dustin Schlatter – 79–2 record in two seasons with the Gophers
- Jacob Volkmann – 3-time all-American, former UFC fighter.
- Gable Steveson - Olympic gold medalist

== Athletic directors ==
Note: From 1974 to 2002, there were separate athletic departments for men and women's sports.

- 1922–30 Fred Luehring
- 1930–32 Herbert O. (Fritz) Crisler
- 1932–41 Frank G. McCormick
- 1941–45 Lou Keller (acting)
- 1945–50 Frank G. McCormick
- 1950–63 Ike J. Armstrong
- 1963–71 Marshall J. Ryman
- 1971–88 Paul Giel (men's)
- 1974–76 Belmar Gunderson (women's)
- 1976–81 Vivian M. Barfield (women's)
- 1981–82 M. Catherine Mathison (women's interim)
- 1982–88 Merrily Dean Baker (women's)
- 1988–89 Holger Christiansen (men's interim)
- 1988–2002 Chris Voelz (women's)
- 1989–91 Rick Bay (men's)
- 1991–92 Dan Meinert (men's interim)
- 1992–95 McKinley Boston (men's)
- 1995–99 Mark Dienhart (men's)
- 1999–2002 Tom Moe (men's)
- 2002–2012 Joel Maturi
- 2012–2015 Norwood Teague
- 2015–2016 Beth Goetz (interim)
- 2016-pres Mark Coyle

== Facilities ==
=== Current facilities ===
- Baseline Tennis Center — tennis
- Bierman Track and Field Stadium — track
- Elizabeth Lyle Robbie Stadium — women's soccer
- Gibson-Nagurski Football Complex
- Jane Sage Cowles Stadium — softball
- Les Bolstad Golf Course — golf, cross country
- 3M Arena at Mariucci — men's hockey
- Ridder Arena — women's hockey
- Siebert Field — baseball
- Maturi Pavilion — gymnastics, volleyball, wrestling
- Huntington Bank Stadium — football
- Williams Arena — basketball, wrestling
- U of M Boathouse — rowing
- Jean K. Freeman University Aquatic Center — swimming and diving

=== Former facilities ===
- Northrop Field (1899–1923)
- Memorial Stadium (1924–1981)
- Hubert H. Humphrey Metrodome (1982–2014)

== See also ==
- List of college athletic programs in Minnesota
