= Go Gopher Victory =

Song of the University of Minnesota

"Go Gopher Victory" is one of the school songs of the University of Minnesota. Composed in 1925 by University graduate Addison H. Douglass, this tune was originally entitled "The Gopher M". It is frequently played at Minnesota Golden Gopher athletic events by the University of Minnesota Marching Band.

== Lyrics ==
Go, Gopher victory
Minnesota go!
Go, Gopher victory
Hit them hard and low RAH! RAH! RAH!
Go Gopher victory
We can always win!
RAH! RAH! RAH! SKI-U-MAH!
HURRAH! Minnesota! HURRAH!
We will fight! Fight! Win! Fight!
Come on Minnesota let's go!
