= Les Bolstad Golf Course =

Golf course in Falcon Heights, Minnesota

- Location within Minnesota Location within the United States
- 44°59′32″N 93°11′46″W

Club information
- Location: 2275 W Larpenteur Ave, Falcon Heights, Minnesota
- Website: uofmgolf.com
- Par: 71
- Length: 6,259 yd (5,723 m)
- Course rating: 70.5
- Slope rating: 126

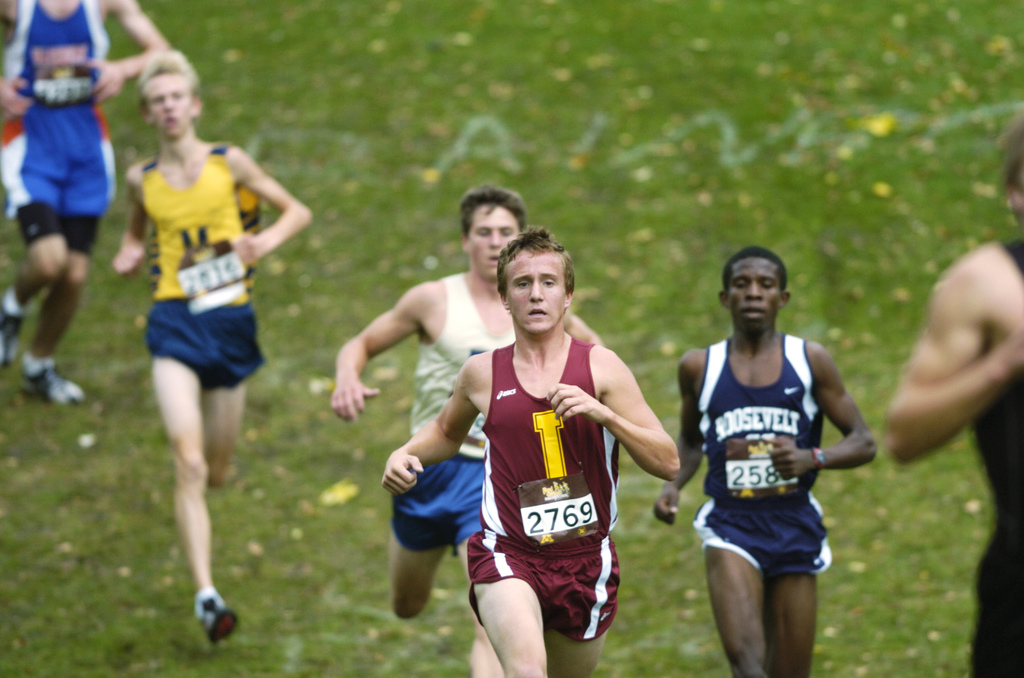
Roy Griak Invitational 2007

Les Bolstad Golf Course was a golf course owned by the University of Minnesota. The course is located in Falcon Heights, Minnesota on the St. Paul Campus of the University. The school's cross country teams use it to hold meets, including the Roy Griak Invitational.

At the conclusion of the 2025 golf season, the University of Minnesota shut down the golf course with plans to sell the 140.9 acres of land. The university cited low revenue and a looming need for essential capital investment. The adjacent training facilities used by the university golf and soccer teams will not be a part of the sale.

The school's golf teams now hold matches off campus in Blaine, Minnesota at the TPC Twin Cities (Tournament Players Club of the Twin Cities).
