= The Minnesota March =

1927 march composed by John Philip Sousa

- by John Philip Sousa
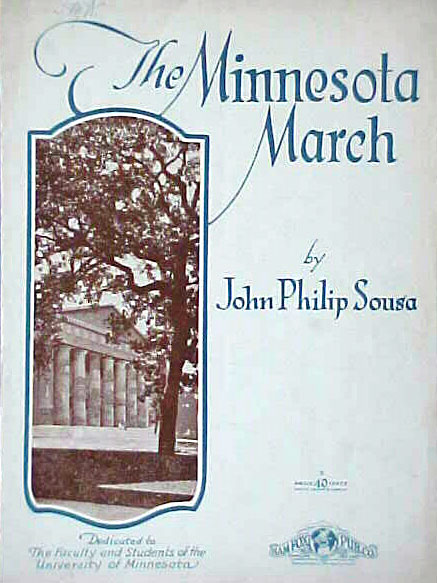
- Year: 1927
- Genre: March
- Dedication: "The faculty and students of the University of Minnesota"
- Published: 1927, New York and Cleveland
- Publisher: Sam Fox Publishing Company

Audio sample
- U.S. Marine Band performing the march: file; help

“The Minnesota March” is a march for wind band written by John Philip Sousa in 1927 for the University of Minnesota. Sousa received an informal request to compose the march from Minnesota football coach Clarence Spears, and agreed to a request from a committee of university officials in October 1926. Sousa used Indian themes in this march, and later added field drum and bugle parts. The march was published by the Sam Fox Publishing Company and was premiered by Sousa and his band on September 3, 1927 at the Minnesota State Fair. It was first performed at the University of Minnesota the following month, on October 26, by the University of Minnesota Band.

The piece was one of four marches written by Sousa expressly for a university. It is now one of the university's school songs, with lyrics written in 1927 by university band director Michael Jalma. The piece is regularly performed by the University of Minnesota Marching Band and pep bands and often sung by students at various athletic events and ceremonies.

== History ==
The U of M Marching Band Centennial Book, Minnesota Hats Off to Thee, published in 1992, described the origins of "The Minnesota March":

"The need for a more adequate marching song had long been felt at Minnesota, yet nothing was really done about it until University band director Michael Jalma conceived the idea that John Philip Sousa might be persuaded to provide the music. He apparently confided this idea to football coach Clarence Spears, for the Minneapolis Tribune credited Spears for informally making such a request to the famous bandleader. In October 1926, Sousa played an engagement at the old Lyceum Theatre in Minneapolis, and a committee of University officials was formed to wait upon him. It consisted of, in addition to Jalma, E.B. Pierce, Secretary of the General Alumni Association; Carlyle Scott, Professor of Music; and Otto S. Zellner, Associate Professor of Surveying; and a member of the University band's faculty advisory committee.

"The committee was cordially received by Sousa on October 16 in his suite at the Radisson Hotel, and he readily agreed to the request, though he said he would have to "wait for inspiration" before he could promise a delivery date. He said that the beautiful Indian legendry that formed the background of Minnesota greatly appealed to him and that he was impressed by the very names with which the state abounded, such as Minnehaha, Chippewa, and Minnesota. He hoped to reflect some of this heritage in his composition."

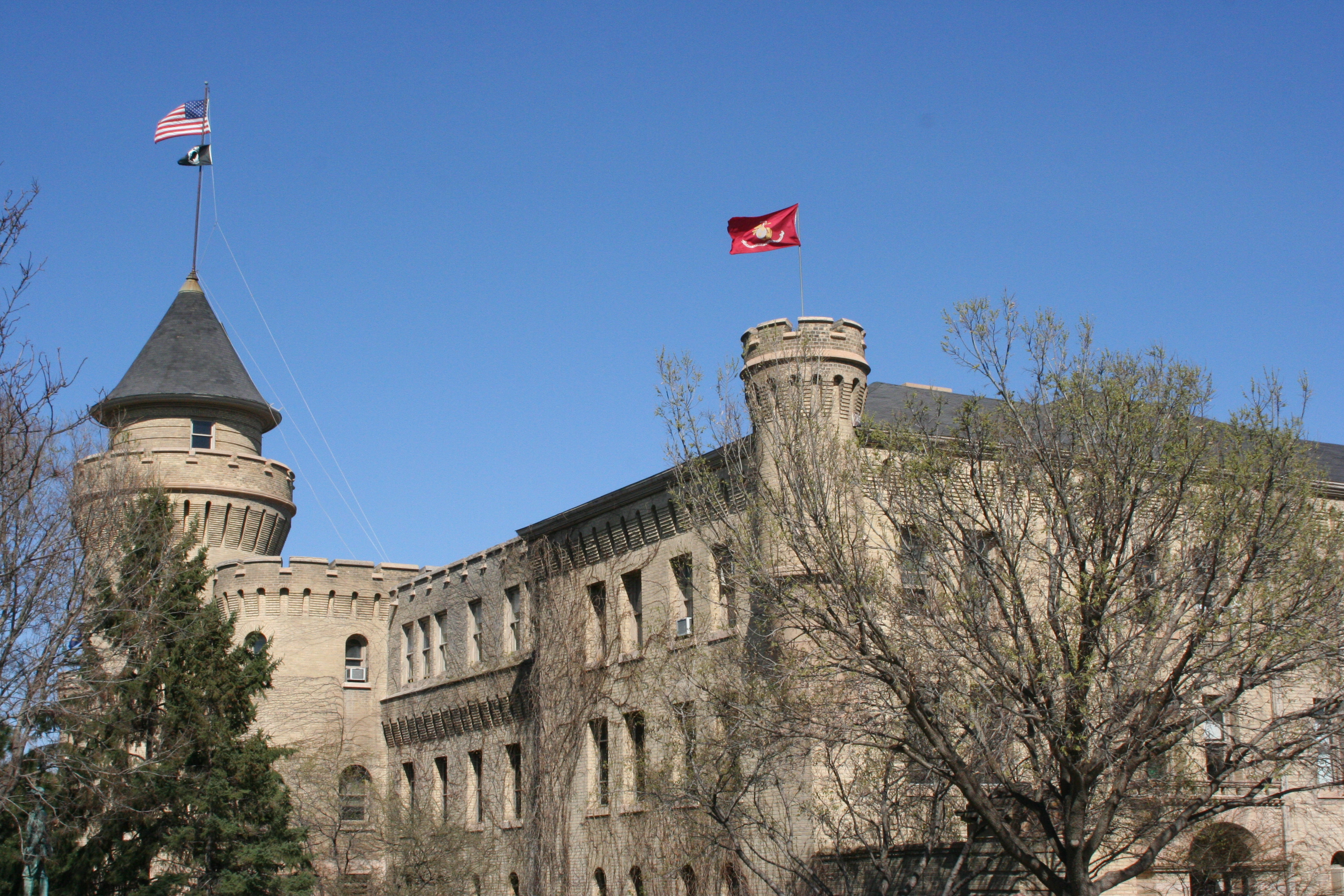
The University of Minnesota Armory, where the march was first performed on campus by the University Band in 1927

Sousa wrote to E.B. Pierce in March 1927, informing him the composition was nearly complete. On Saturday, September 3, 1927 Sousa and his band premiered the march at the Minnesota State Fair before an "appreciative crowd of 12,000 that packed the grandstand." Sousa described the march as "the best piece I have ever written." However, a disagreement arose after university president Lotus D. Coffman was "asked to accept Sousa’s manuscript of the march on behalf of the university" but refused because "he felt the march should be presented at a university function, not at the state fair." Nonetheless, the dedication ceremony for the march went ahead, and President of the Minnesota State Agricultural Society, William F. Sanger, accepted Sousa's manuscript "on behalf of the State." State fair officials described the fair as "an innocent third party" and stated they only wished to fulfill the personal wishes of Sousa. In his 1964 official history of the state fair, Harry J. Frost wrote that Sousa was "taken aback by the rebuff" but that "the good-natured bandmaster was not offended."

James Davies, music critic of the Minneapolis Tribune, was present for the march's premiere and gave a strongly positive review; he described it as "vital" and "fine," and stated that it contained "the splendid old rhythmic power" and "reflected more than a passing glimpse of academic life." "The Minnesota March" was first performed on campus by the university band during a song fest in the University of Minnesota Armory on October 26, 1927, receiving enthusiastic applause and an encore performance.

== Lyrics ==
Michael Jalma, director of the university band—who first conceived the idea of asking Sousa to compose the march—wrote lyrics for "The Minnesota March" which are still used. His lyrics were sung at football games in fall 1927 and are as follows:

RAH! RAH! SKI-U-MAH!

RAH! RAH! RAH!

March on, march on to victory!
Loyal sons of the varsity.
Fight on, fight on for Minnesota,
For the Glory of the old maroon and gold.

March on, march on to win the game,
DOWN THE FIELD, fighting every play.
We're with you, team, fighting team,
Hear our song, we cheer along
To help you win a victory!

== See also ==
- List of marches by John Philip Sousa
