= Minnesota Fight =

Song of the University of Minnesota

"Minnesota Fight" is one of several school songs of the University of Minnesota. Responding to a 1925 contest to find an additional fight song for the school, university graduate Truman E. Rickard entered a piece entitled "Minnesota! Let's Go!". Rickard shared the contest's hundred-dollar prize with another entry, Marion Bassett's "Our Minnesota". Rickard's fight song can still be heard at Minnesota Golden Gopher athletic events, but is now known as "Minnesota Fight".

== Lyrics ==
Minnesota! Come on! Let's go!
It's a loyal crowd that's here;
With a Sis-Boom-Bah and a Ski-U-Mah,
For the varsity we cheer!
RAH! RAH!
The old fight gang! On your marks—Slam! Bang!
Hit 'em hard and hit 'em low!
So Fight! Minnesota, Fight
Minnesota! Come on! Let's go!
