= Minnesota Rouser =

Fight song of the University of Minnesota

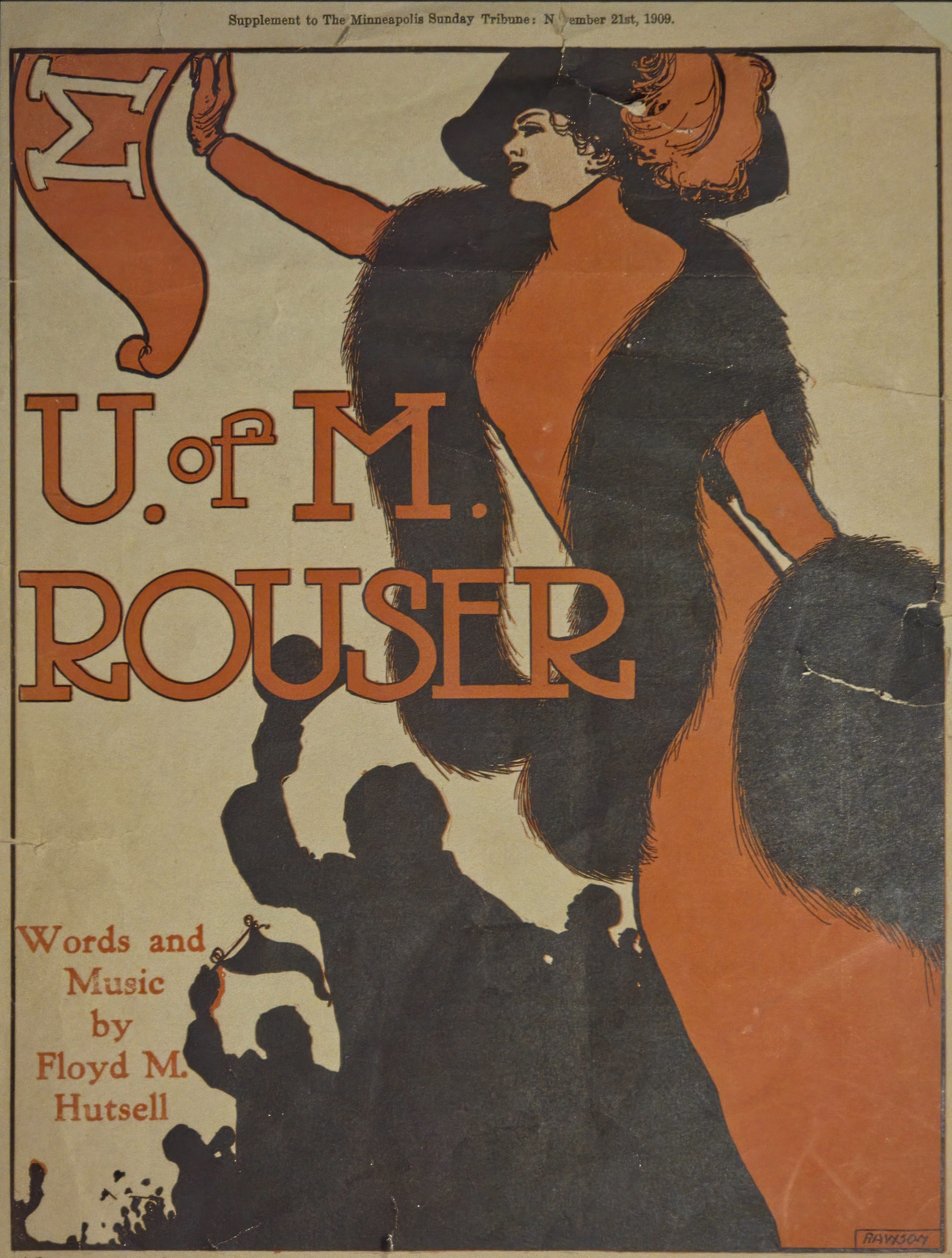
U. of M. Rouser, published as a Supplement to The Minneapolis Sunday Tribune: November 21st, 1909

Current lyrics

Minnesota, hats off to thee!
To thy colors true we shall ever be,
Firm and strong, united are we.
Rah, rah, rah, for Ski-U-Mah,
Rah! Rah! Rah! Rah!
Rah for the U of M.
M-I-N-N-E-S-O-T-A
Minnesota! Minnesota!
Yaaaay Gophers!

Original lyrics

Rah, rah,
Honor to our college Minnesota U.
Loyal to thy standards We'll never be untrue.
Underneath thy pennant Pulses beat with pride
And victory e'er shall be our aim O'er the nationwide, (Yell)

Minnesota, hats off to thee,
To thy colors true we shall ever be...
Firm and strong, united are we.
Rah, rah, rah, for Ski-U-Ma,
Rah, rah, rah, rah, rah, rah, rah,
Rah, for the U of M. Ah........ (repeat refrain)

The "Minnesota Rouser" is the fight song of the University of Minnesota. It is played at all Minnesota Golden Gophers games.

== Lyrics ==
The phrase 'Ski-U-Mah' was part of an early cheer for the U of M.

Gopher fans traditionally thrust their fists in the air during the spell-out, and make a circular motion with their fist during the yell.

The original lyrics were published in the Minneapolis Tribune, November 21, 1909.

== History ==
It was the subject of a 1909 contest held by the Minnesota Daily and the Minneapolis Tribune to write a suitable song for Minnesota football games, to replace the hymnlike "Hail! Minnesota". The song was written by Floyd Hutsell, then the choir director of First Methodist Episcopal Church in Minneapolis. He originally included a verse, but only the refrain is sung today. Hutsell is best known outside Minnesota as "Robert LaMar," a prominent vaudeville and operetta actor and producer. The song was originally titled, "The U. of M. Rouser," but eventually became known as simply the "Minnesota Rouser."

Sheet music to the winning song was published November 21, 1909, as a Supplement to the Minneapolis Sunday Tribune. Written in the key of G major, it was titled "The U. of M. Rouser" and was dedicated to B. A. Rose, Band Master, U. of M. The verse was included in this publication. The Judges for the fighting song, listed on the back, were: A.O. Eberhart, Governor of Minnesota; Cyrus W. Northrop, President of the University of Minnesota; Carlyle M. Scott, Professor of Music, University of Minnesota; J.A. Sende, Chief Musician, University of Minnesota Band; and Arthur Allen, President of the University of Minnesota Glee and Mandolin Club.

The contest spawned another prominent Big Ten song. William T. Purdy also submitted a song for the contest, titled "Minnesota, Minnesota." He withdrew it from the contest at the urging of his lyricist, Carl Beck, who wanted to offer the song to the University of Wisconsin, where it became "On Wisconsin".

== In popular culture ==
The Boston-based rock orchestra, The Wings of Fire Orchestra, uses a variation of the U. of Minnesota Rouser on the song Connorfool (from Bullfighter Ballet, 2006).

On The Rocky and Bullwinkle Show, the lyrics are changed to "Wossamotta, Hats Off to U" ("Hail, Wossamotta, hail/Better we should land in jail.")

== See also ==
- Ski-U-Mah
