= General College Truth Movement =

The General College Truth Movement (GCTM) was a briefly lived but large group, led by students, that opposed the closure of the General College at the University of Minnesota in the United States.

The General College was the most diverse college at the University of Minnesota, disproportionately serving working class students, first-generation college students, and students of color. University Regents voted to close college by an 11-1 vote on June 10, 2005.

The group was founded on April 16, 2005, and consisted of U of M students, staff and faculty, as well as some community members and high school students.

The group staged several demonstrations on the University campus. At 10:00am on Wednesday May 4, 2005, GCTM members held a peaceful sit-in to oppose the closing of the General College in the University of Minnesota President's office, Morrill Hall. Nine people were arrested and two protesters were pepper sprayed by University Police for refusing to leave during overnight hours.

The decision to close the College was made by an 11-1 vote of the University of Minnesota Regents on June 10, 2005. Surviving departments following the closure have been merged into the College of Education and Human Development.

== Significance ==
The General College Truth Movement was part of a long history of anti-racist student movements at the University of Minnesota. This legacy includes the 1969 Black Student Morrill Hall Takeover and the Whose Diversity? campaign.
