= Roy Griak =

Roy Griak (October 5, 1923 – July 9, 2015) was a cross country and track and field coach. He was the head cross country and track and field coach at the University of Minnesota from 1963–1996. In 2001, he was inducted into the National Track and Field Hall of Fame.

== Early life ==
Griak was born in Montana but raised in Duluth, Minnesota. He served three years in the US Army Infantry during World War II. After the war, he enrolled at the University of Minnesota, where he was a letter-winner in both cross country and track and field. Griak earned his bachelor's degree in education and later also obtained his master's degree.

== Career ==
Griak taught at Nicollet High School in Nicollet, Minnesota, where he started a track and field program and coached 5 sports. He later went on to teach and coach at Mankato Public Schools and St. Louis Park High School.

In 1962, Jim Kelly retired from the University of Minnesota and Griak filled his vacancy, taking a pay cut from $12,000 to $8,500. He spent 33 years as the head coach, and continued for 19 years as an assistant coach. On July 9, 2015 Roy Griak died at the age of 91. Gophers athletics director Norwood Teague said in a statement that "Roy went to Minnesota, coached here for more than 30 years, worked here for more than 50 years and impacted more lives than almost anybody in the history of athletic department."

=== Coaching accomplishments ===
- 10 years, St. Louis Park High School
- 33 years, head coach, University of Minnesota
- 19 years, assistant coach, University of Minnesota
- Big Ten Conference cross country titles in 1964 and 1969, and runners-up in 1968
- Fourth place finish at NCAA cross country finals
- Big Ten Conference Conference title, 1968
- Coached 47 cross country and track and field All-American athletes, including three NCAA champions and 60 Big Ten individual champions.

=== Other accomplishments ===
- Roy Griak co-founded the Twin Cities Race for the Cure, which over the years, has raised millions of dollars towards breast cancer research.
- Over his time coaching at the U of M, Griak raised more than two million dollars for the Gopher cross country and track and field teams.

=== Roy Griak Invitational ===
The Roy Griak Invitational was named in his honor and has become one of the nation's largest cross country events. The meet consists of six collegiate races (Division I-III) and four high school races (varsity and junior varsity) totaling over 4,000 runners.
