= College of Continuing and Professional Studies =

Professional school of the University of Minnesota

University of Minnesota College of Continuing and Professional Studies
- Established: 1913
- Dean: Radhika Seshan
- Location: 201 Coffey Hall, 1420 Eckles Avenue, Falcon Heights, Minnesota, 55108, Saint Paul, Minnesota, United States; 44°59′2″N 93°11′7″W
- Campus: Urban
- Website: ccaps.umn.edu

The University of Minnesota College of Continuing and Professional Studies (CCAPS) is a professional school of the University of Minnesota based at its Saint Paul Campus. The school offers applied graduate and undergraduate degrees, professional development certificates, practical-knowledge conferences and individualized degrees.

The College changed its name from the College of Continuing Education (CCE) in October, 2017 "to better reflect our mission, which is to provide opportunities for people to enhance their academic credentials, to advance their careers through professional courses, and to continue to learn across their lifespan through enrichment activities".

The General Extension Division (as it was originally named) was founded in 1913 by University President George Edgar Vincent, to provide ongoing education to adult learners. Over the years since then it has had various names including the College of Continuing Education and Extension, and University College. Throughout the years, the mission has remained the same: to provide for the educational needs of the people of Minnesota.

== Programs ==
=== Credit Programs ===
Program	Credential(s)
Construction Management	Bachelor of Applied Science, Minor, Certificate
Health and Wellbeing Sciences	Bachelor of Science
Healthcare Management	Bachelor of Applied Science, Minor, Certificate
Information Technology Infrastructure	Bachelor of Applied Science, Minor, Certificate
Inter-College Program	Bachelor of Arts, Bachelor of Science
Long Term Care Management	Minor, Certificate
Multidisciplinary Studies	Bachelor of Arts, Bachelor of Science
Real Estate: Development and Management	Minor, Certificate
Addictions Counseling	Master of Professional Studies, Minor
Advanced Sexual Health Education	Graduate Certificate
Arts and Cultural Leadership	Graduate Minor
Biological Sciences	Master of Biological Sciences
Human Sexuality	Graduate Certificate
Integrated Behavioral Health	Master of Professional Studies
Long Term Care Leadership	Master of Professional Studies
Sexual Health	Master of Professional Studies
Sex Therapy	Graduate Certificate, Master of Professional Studies
Transgender and Gender Diverse Health	Graduate Certificate
Trauma Informed Care Certificate	Graduate Certificate

=== Noncredit Professional Development Certificates ===
- Agile
- Agile Scrum
- Applied Data Analysis
- Budget and Financial Management
- Business Analysis
- Business Process Improvement
- Business Writing
- Communications
- Cross-Functional Collaboration
- Digital Marketing
- Human Resource Generalist
- Leadership Essentials
- Marketing Management
- Organization Development
- Program Management
- Project Management
- Professional Train the Trainer
- Supervision

=== College Preparation for High School Students (Dual Enrollment) ===
- College in the Schools
- Post-Secondary Enrollment Options

=== Minnesota English Language Programs ===
- Academic English Program
- Intensive English Program
- Student English Language Support
- English Learning for Multilingual Workforces
- Customized English and Culture Programs
- ESL Testing
- English Language Resource

=== Lifelong Learning Programs ===
- The Midlife Academy
- Osher Lifelong Learning Institute
