= University of Minnesota =

Public university in Minnesota, U.S.

- Other names: University of Minnesota; U of M; UMN
- Motto: Commune vinculum omnibus artibus (Latin)
- Motto in English: "A common bond for all the arts"
- Type: Public land-grant research university
- Established: 1851; 175 years ago
- Parent institution: University of Minnesota System
- Accreditation: HLC
- Academic affiliations: AAU; CUMU; URA; space-grant
- Endowment: $6.45 billion (system-wide, 2025)
- Budget: $4.5 billion (system-wide, 2024)
- President: Rebecca Cunningham
- Provost: Gretchen Ritter
- Academic staff: 4,923 (fall 2025)
- Total staff: 27,715 (fall 2025)
- Students: 57,879 (fall 2025)
- Undergraduates: 32,632 (fall 2025)
- Postgraduates: 11,210 (fall 2025)
- Doctoral students: 3,884 (fall 2025)
- Other students: 10,153 (fall 2025)
- Location: Minneapolis-Saint Paul, Minnesota, United States; 44°58′30″N 93°14′07″W
- Campus: 2,730 acres (1,100 ha); Large city
- Other campuses: Rochester
- Newspaper: Minnesota Daily
- Colors: Maroon and gold
- Nickname: Golden Gophers
- Sporting affiliations: NCAA Division I FBS – Big Ten; WCHA
- Mascot: Goldy Gopher
- Website: twin-cities.umn.edu

The University of Minnesota Twin Cities (historically known as University of Minnesota) is a public land-grant research university in the Twin Cities of Minneapolis and Saint Paul, Minnesota, United States. It is the flagship institution of the University of Minnesota System and is organized into 19 colleges, schools, and other major academic units.

Founded by the Minnesota Territorial Legislature as a territorial university in 1851, seven years before Minnesota achieved statehood, the Twin Cities campus is the oldest and largest in the University of Minnesota System. Its enrollment of 56,666 students as of fall 2024 places it among the ten largest U.S. campuses by enrollment. The campus comprises locations in Minneapolis and St. Paul, approximately 3 mi (4.8 km) apart.

The University of Minnesota is classified as an "R1: Doctoral Universities – Very high research activity" by the Carnegie Classification. It is a member of the Association of American Universities. The National Science Foundation ranked the University of Minnesota 22nd among American universities for research and development expenditures in 2022 with $1.202 billion.

The Minnesota Golden Gophers compete in 21 intercollegiate sports in NCAA Division I as a member of the Big Ten Conference and have won 29 national championships. As of March 2024, Minnesota's current and former students have won a total of 90 Olympic medals. There are 25 Nobel laureates associated with the university.

== History ==
The University of Minnesota was established in Minneapolis in 1851, seven years prior to Minnesota achieving statehood, following a charter granted by the Minnesota Territorial Legislature and Governor Alexander Ramsey and the subsequent election of a board of regents. In its initial years, the university encountered significant challenges and depended on contributions from various donors to remain operational, notably including support from South Carolina Governor William Aiken Jr..

In 1867, the university received land grant status through the Morrill Act of 1862. With lands taken from Dakota people, the university was able to revive itself after closing in 1858. The Dakota people have not been credited for the expropriation of their lands.

An 1876 donation from flour miller John S. Pillsbury is generally credited with saving the school. Since then, Pillsbury has become known as "The Father of the University." Pillsbury Hall is named in his honor.

Academic milestones began with Warren Clark Eustis and Henry Martyn Williamson graduating in 1873 as the university's first graduates. Helen Marr Ely was the first female graduate in 1875. The university progressed by awarding its first master's degree in 1880 and conferring its first Ph.D. in 1888.

As the 20th century began, the university expanded its academic offerings. In 1908, the university inaugurated the Program of Mortuary Science, becoming the first state university in the United States to do so. The School of Nursing was established in 1909, the first continuous nursing school on a university campus in the United States. The nursing school later opened its doors to male students in 1949.

The university first integrated its faculty in 1948 when it hired its first African American, Ruby Pernell.

20th-century breakthroughs at the University of Minnesota positioned it as a leader in medical innovation. In 1954, C. Walton Lillehei and F. John Lewis performed the world's first successful open-heart surgery using cross-circulation. 1955 saw Richard DeWall and Lillehei develop the bubble oxygenator, setting the stage for modern heart-lung machines. This was followed by Lillehei's performance of the first artificial heart valve implant in a human in 1958, and in the same year, Earl Bakken, co-founder of Medtronic, Inc., developed the first portable pacemaker, introduced into practice by Lillehei.

The latter part of the 20th century saw the university's continued innovation in medical transplantation, including the world's first successful kidney/pancreas transplant in 1967, a bone marrow transplant in 1968, and a living donor pancreas transplant in 1998. Another notable contribution to agriculture came in 1991, with the development of the honeycrisp apple.

== Campuses ==
Note: The flagship University of Minnesota campus is the Twin Cities campus, which comprises grounds in St. Paul and Minneapolis, the latter divided into areas on both the east and west banks of the Mississippi River. Administratively, these are all one campus, but for purposes of simplicity, this article will apply "campus" to its component parts where necessary to avoid confusion with the names of cities.

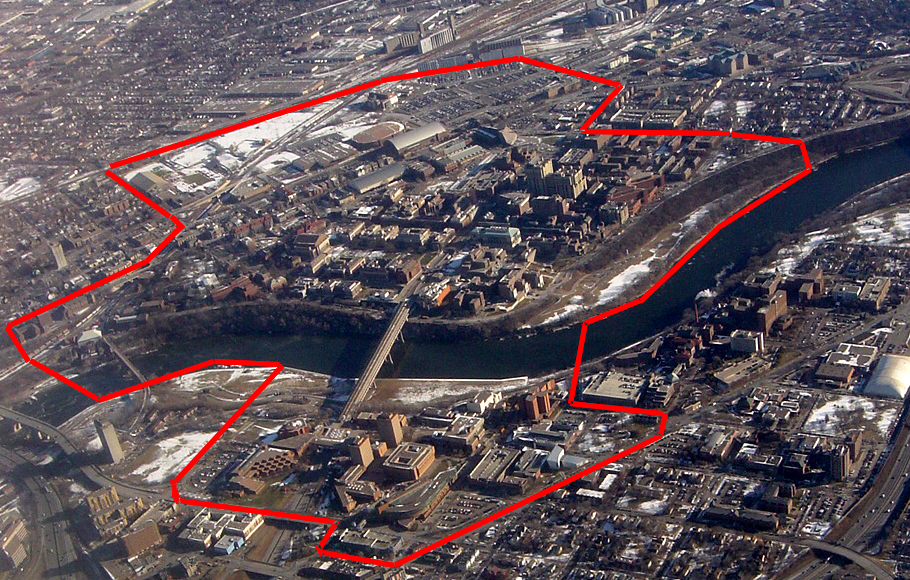
An aerial photo of the Minneapolis campus, facing east

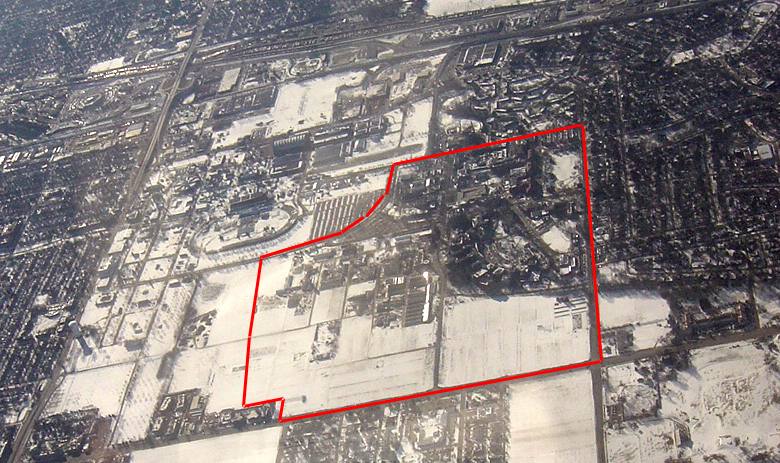
An aerial photo of St. Paul campus, facing south

As the largest of five campuses across the University of Minnesota system, the Twin Cities campus has more than 50,000 students. This makes it the ninth-largest campus student body in the United States. It has over 300 research, education, and outreach centers and institutes.

=== Minneapolis ===
The original Minneapolis campus overlooked the Saint Anthony Falls on the Mississippi River, but it was later moved about a mile (1.6 km) downstream to its current location. The original site is now marked by a small park known as Chute Square at the intersection of University and Central avenues.

The school shut down following a financial crisis during the American Civil War, but reopened in 1867 with considerable financial help from John S. Pillsbury. It was upgraded from a preparatory school to a college in 1869. Today, the university's Minneapolis campus is divided by the Mississippi River into an East Bank and a West Bank.

The Minneapolis campus has several residence halls: 17th Avenue Hall, Centennial Hall, Frontier Hall, Territorial Hall, Pioneer Hall, Sanford Hall, Wilkins Hall, Middlebrook Hall, Yudof Hall, and Comstock Hall.

==== East Bank ====
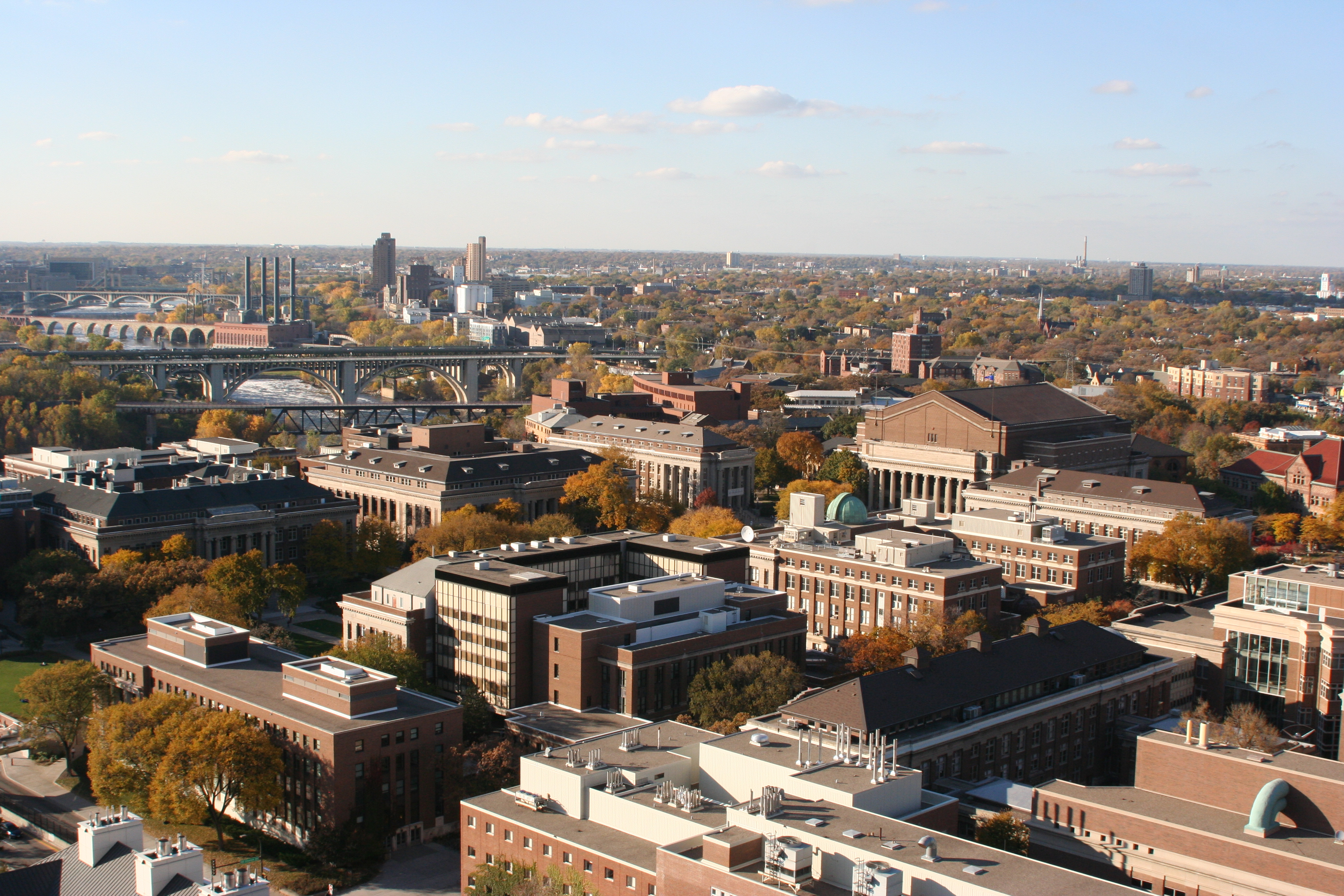
East Bank

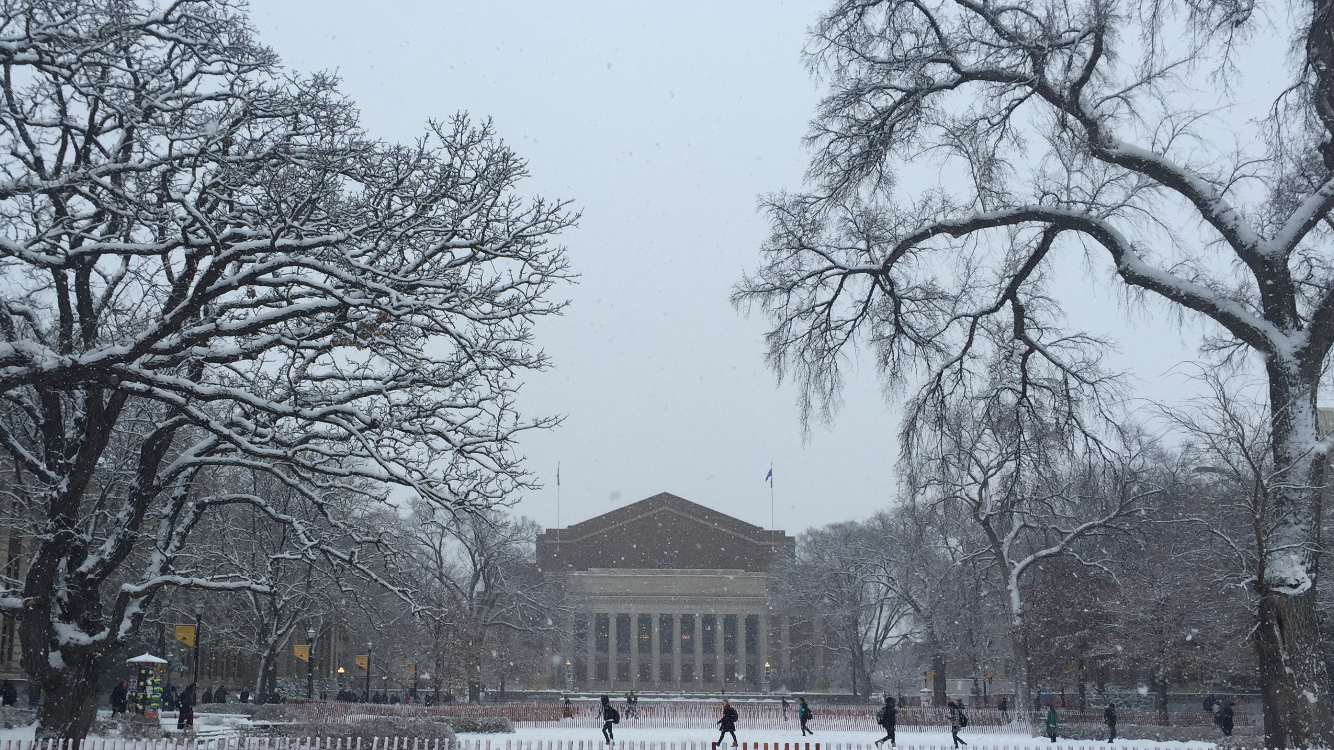
Northrop Mall in the winter

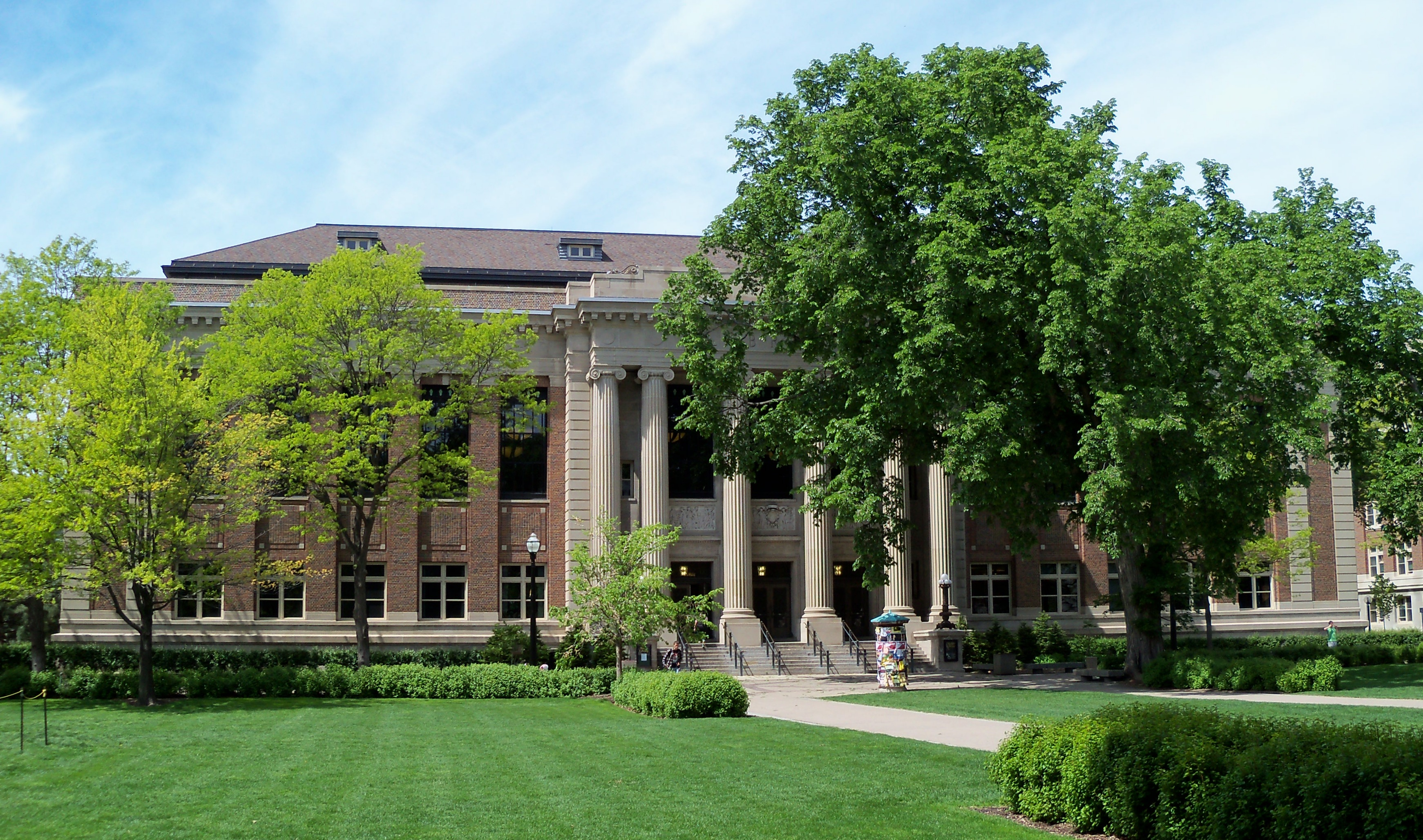
Walter Library, Northrop Mall

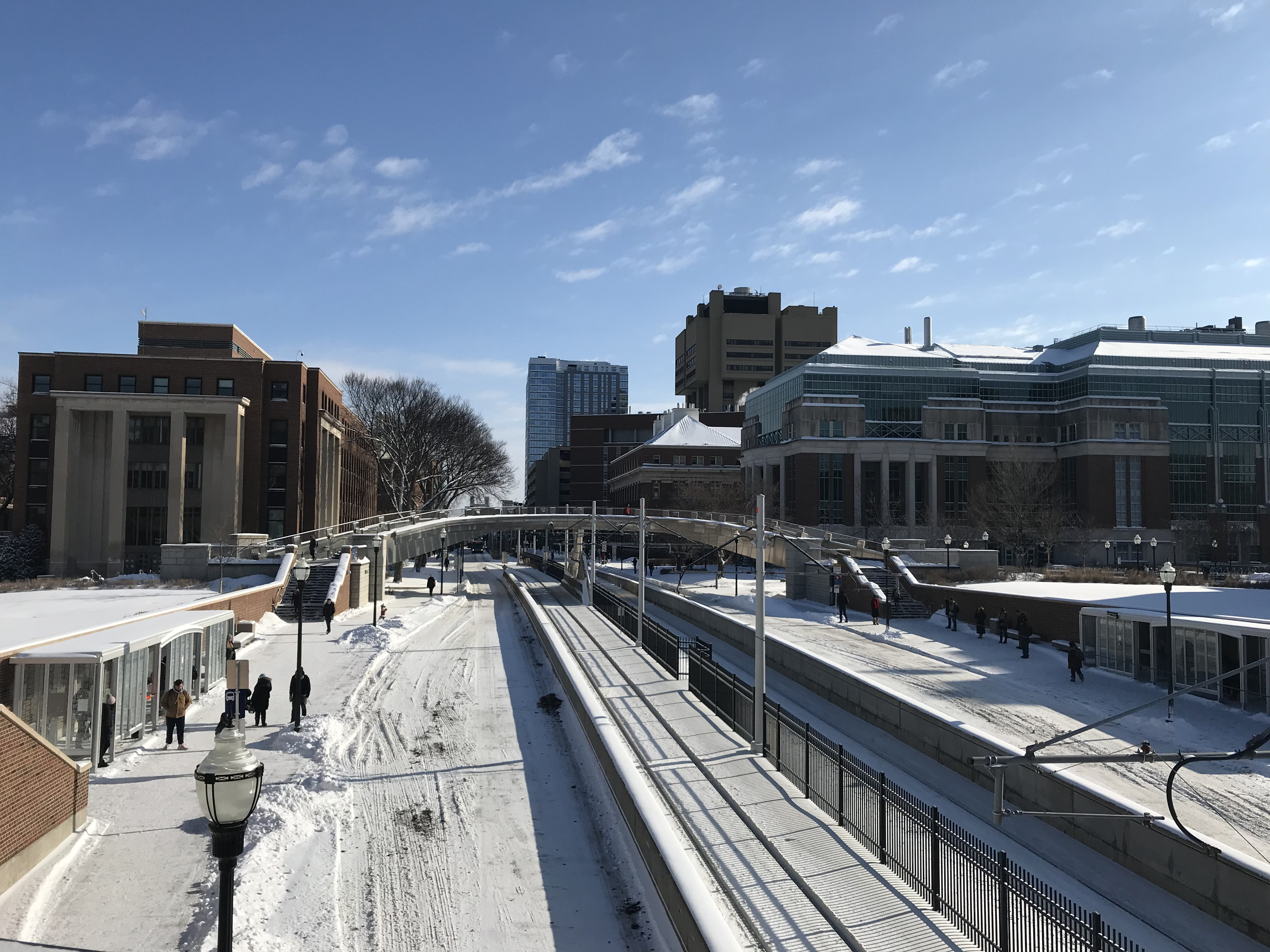
East Bank campus in winter. Ford Hall on the left, Nils Hasselmo Hall on the right of the light rail.

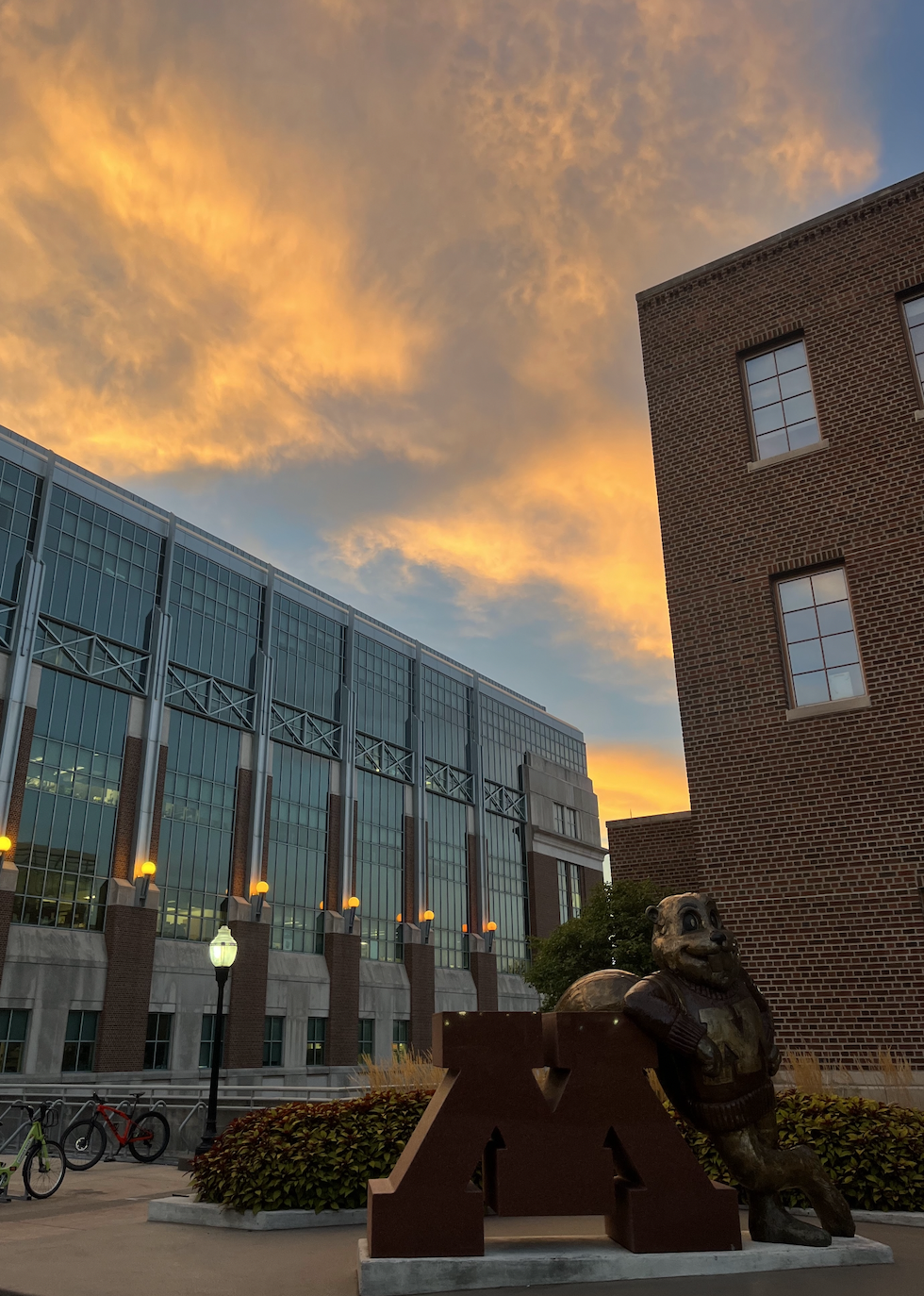
The Goldy the Gopher statue located in front of Coffman (the student union) in the Mall area of the U of MN Twin Cities

The East Bank, the main portion of the campus, covers 307 acres (124 ha) and is divided into several areas: the Knoll area, the Mall area, the Health area, the Athletic area, and the Gateway area.

The Knoll area, the oldest extant part of the university, is in the northwestern corner of the campus. Many buildings in this area are well over 100 years old, such as some of the 13 in the Old Campus Historic District. Today, most disciplines in this area relate to the humanities. Burton Hall is home to the College of Education and Human Development. Folwell Hall and Jones Hall are primarily used by the language departments. A residence hall, Sanford Hall, and a student-apartment complex, Roy Wilkins Hall, are in this area. This area is just south of the Dinkytown neighborhood and business area.

Northrop Mall is arguably the center of the Minneapolis campus. The plan for the Mall was based on a design by Cass Gilbert, although his scheme was too extravagant to be fully implemented. Several of the campus's primary buildings surround the Mall area. Northrop Auditorium provides a northern anchor, with Coffman Memorial Union (CMU) to the south. Four of the larger buildings to the sides of the Mall are the primary mathematics, physics, and chemistry buildings (Vincent Hall, Tate Laboratory and Smith Hall, respectively) and Walter Library. Smith Hall and Walter Library were built during the Lotus Coffman administration.

The Mall area is home to the College of Liberal Arts, which is Minnesota's largest public or private college, and the College of Science and Engineering. Behind CMU is another residence hall, Comstock Hall, and another student-apartment complex, Yudof Hall. The Northrop Mall Historic District was formally listed in the National Register of Historic Places in January 2018.

The Health area is to the southeast of the Mall area and focuses on undergraduate buildings for biological science students, as well as the homes of the college of Pharmacy, the School of Nursing, the School of Dentistry, the Medical School, the School of Public Health, and M Health Fairview Hospitals and Clinics. This complex of buildings forms what is known as the University of Minnesota Medical Center. Part of the College of Biological Sciences is housed in this area.

Across the street from the University of Minnesota Medical Center Fairview is an area known as the "Superblock", a four-city-block space comprising four residence halls, Pioneer, Frontier, Centennial and Territorial Halls. The Superblock is one of the most popular locations for undergraduate on-campus housing because it has the largest concentration of students living on campus and has a multitude of social activities between the residence halls.

The Athletic area is directly north of the Superblock and includes four recreation/athletic facilities: the University Recreation Center, Cooke Hall, the University Fieldhouse, and the University Aquatic Center. These facilities are all connected by tunnels and skyways, allowing students to use one locker room facility. North of this complex is the Huntington Bank Stadium, Williams Arena, Mariucci Arena, Ridder Arena, and the Baseline Tennis Center.

The Gateway area, the easternmost section of campus, is primarily composed of office buildings instead of classrooms and lecture halls. The most prominent building is McNamara Alumni Center. The university is also heavily invested in a biomedical research initiative and has built five biomedical research buildings that form a biomedical complex directly north of Huntington Bank Stadium.

===== Architecture =====
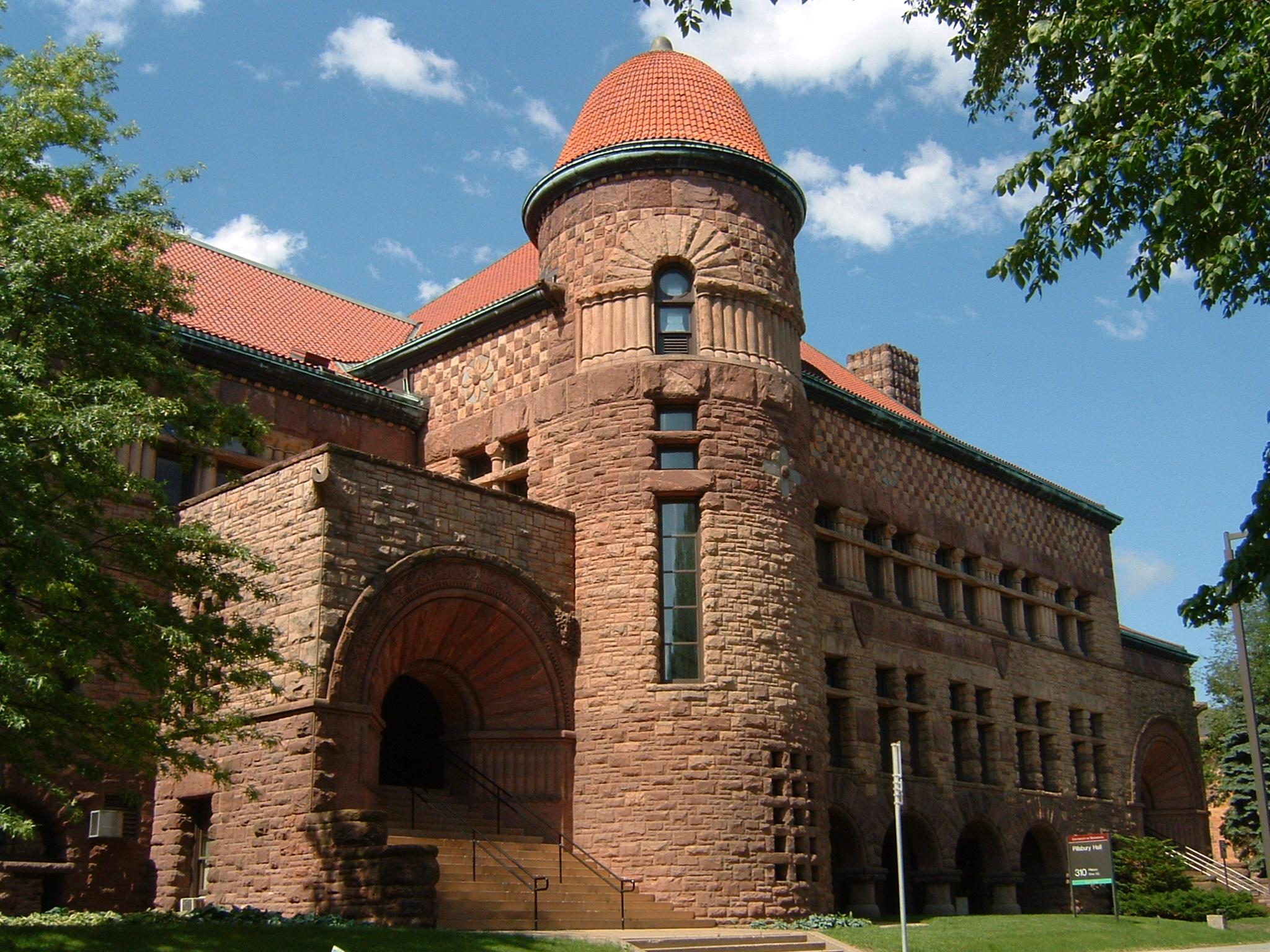
Pillsbury Hall, one of the oldest buildings on campus (1889)

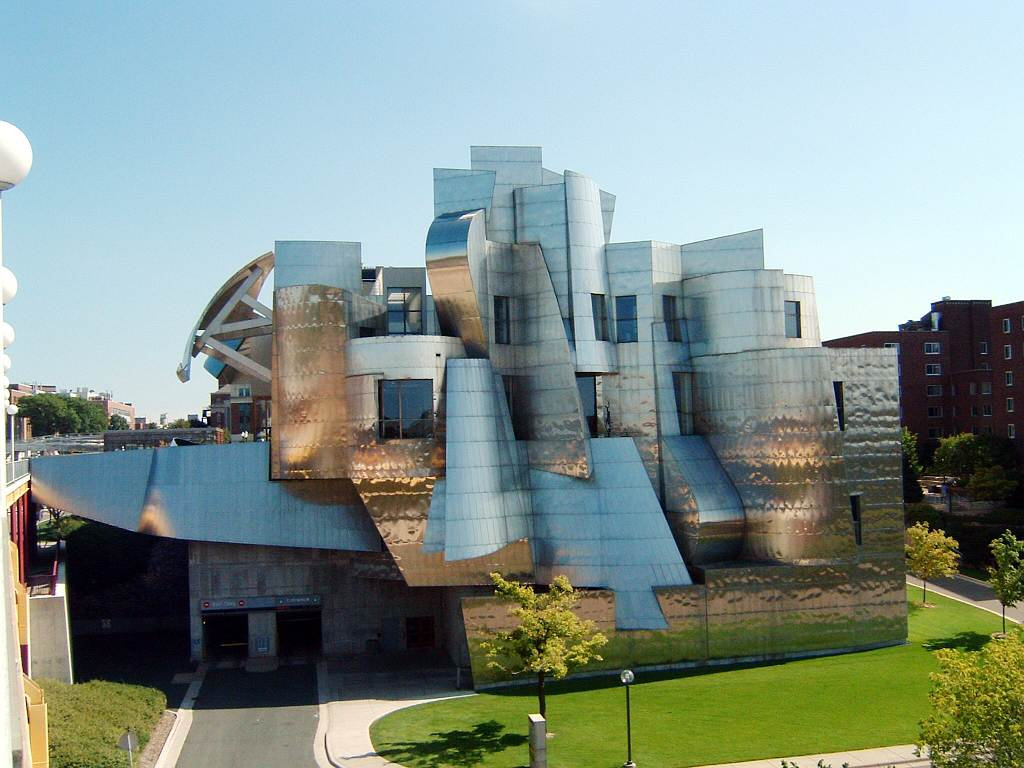
Weisman Art Museum

The Armory, northeast of the Mall area, is built like a Norman castle. It features a sally-port entrance facing Church Street and a tower that was originally intended to be the professor of military science's residence. Since it originally held the athletics department, the Armory also features a gymnasium. Today it is home to military science classes and the university's Reserve Officers' Training Corps.

Several buildings in the Old Campus Historic District were designed by early Minnesota architect LeRoy Buffington. One of the most notable is Pillsbury Hall, designed by Buffington and Harvey Ellis in the Richardsonian Romanesque style. Pillsbury Hall's polychromatic facade incorporates several sandstone varieties that were available in Minnesota during the time of construction. Buffington also designed the exterior of Burton Hall, considered one of the strongest specimens of Greek Revival architecture in Minnesota.

Many of the buildings on the East Bank were designed by the prolific Minnesota architect Clarence H. Johnston, including the Jacobean Folwell Hall and the Beaux-Arts edifices of Northrop Auditorium and Walter Library, which he considered the heart of the university. Johnston's son, Clarence Johnston Jr, was also an architect and designed the original Bell Museum building and Coffman Memorial Union in the 1930s.

The Malcolm Moos Health Sciences Tower, which is the tallest building on the Twin Cities campus, is a noted example of brutalist architecture.

In more recent years, Frank Gehry designed the Frederick R. Weisman Art Museum. Completed in 1993, the Weisman Art Museum is a typical example of his work with curving metallic structures. The abstract structure is considered highly significant because it was built prior to the widespread use of computer-aided design in architecture. It also ushered in a new era of architecture at the university, which continued with the completion of the McNamara Alumni Center in 2000 and Bruininks Hall (formerly STSS) in 2010.

Another notable structure is the addition to the Architecture building, designed by Steven Holl and completed in 2002. It won an American Institute of Architects award for its innovative design. The Architecture building was then renamed Rapson Hall after the local modernist architect and School of Architecture Dean Ralph Rapson.

The university also has a "Greek row" of historic fraternities and sororities located north of campus on University Avenue SE.

==== West Bank ====
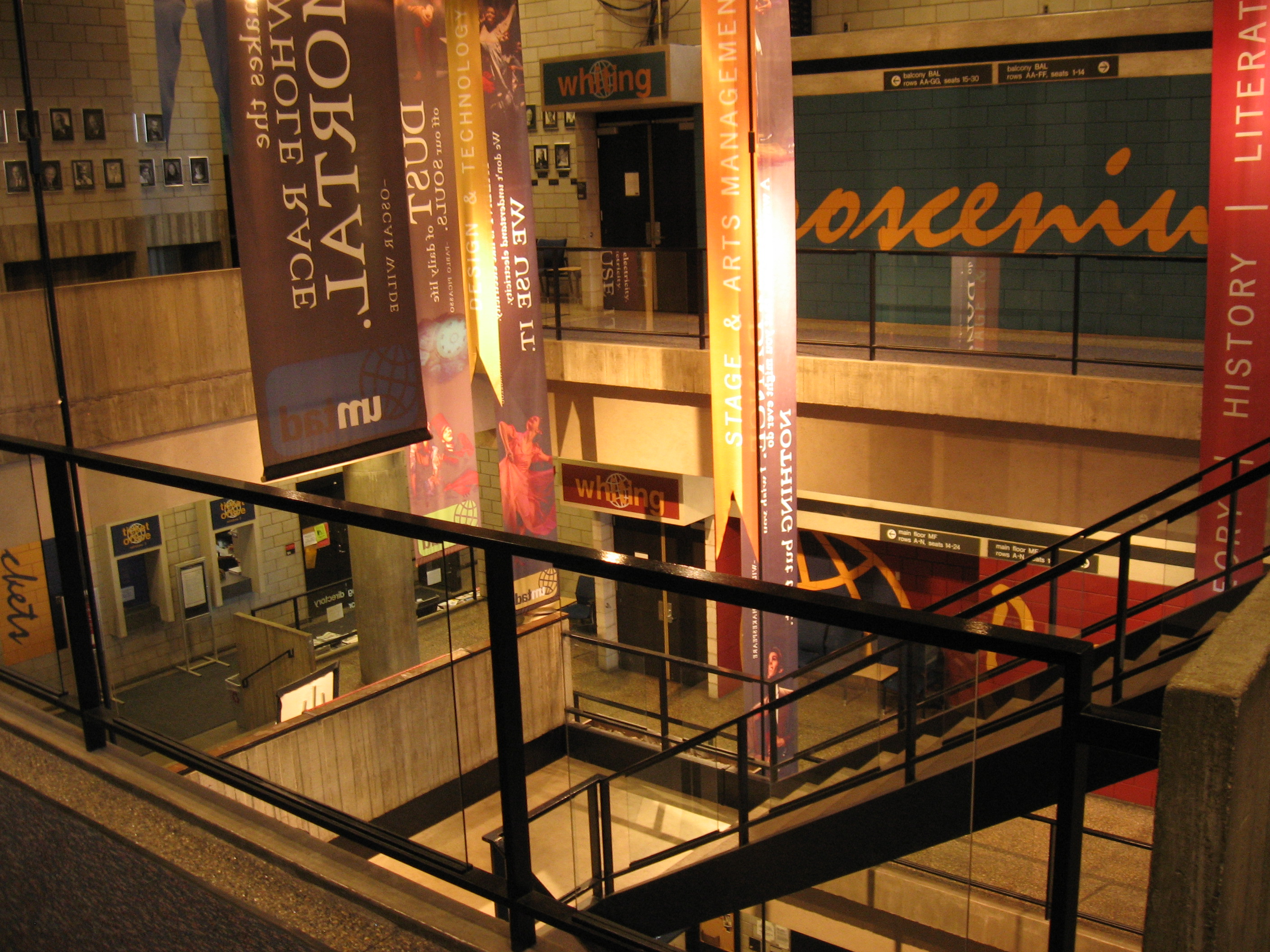
Department of Theatre Arts & Dance, Rarig Center

The West Bank covers 53 acres (21 ha). The West Bank is home to the University of Minnesota Law School, the Humphrey School of Public Affairs, the Carlson School of Management, School of Music, various social science buildings, and the performing arts center. The West Bank Arts Quarter includes the Rarig Center, Barbara Barker Center for Dance, Ferguson Hall (School of Music), Ted Mann Concert Hall and Regis Center for Art. Due to the numerous arts departments on the West Bank, it is home to several annual interdisciplinary arts festivals.

Wilson Library, the largest library in the university system, is also on the West Bank, as is Middlebrook Hall, the largest residence hall on campus. The Elmer L. Andersen Library is home to the university's Archives and Special Collections Department.

=== St. Paul ===
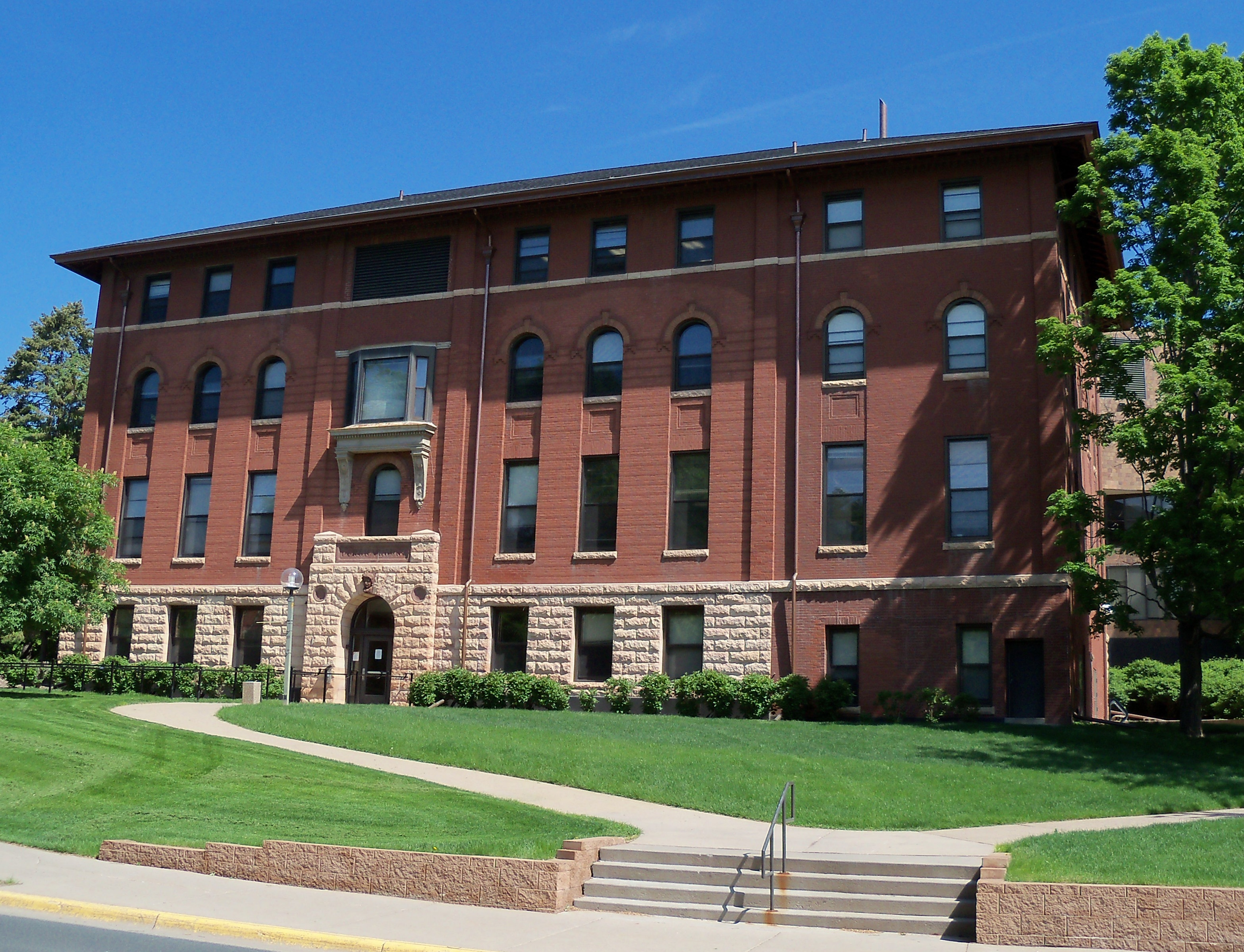
McNeal Hall houses the Goldstein Museum of Design.

The St. Paul campus is by St. Paul and the suburb of Falcon Heights, about 3 mi (4.8 km) from the Minneapolis campus. The default place name for the ZIP code serving the campus is "St. Paul." The College of Food, Agricultural and Natural Resource Sciences, including the University of Minnesota Food Industry Center and many other disciplines from social sciences to vocational education, are on this campus. It also includes the College of Continuing and Professional Studies, College of Veterinary Medicine, and College of Biological Sciences.

The extensive lawns, flowers, trees, and surrounding University research farm plots are all notable amenities of the grounds. It also has a grassy mall of its own. Prominent on this campus is Bailey Hall, the St. Paul campus' only residence hall. Campus Connector buses run every five minutes on weekdays when school is in session, and every 20 minutes on weekends.

The Continuing Education and Conference Center, which serves over 20,000 conference attendees per year, is also on the St. Paul campus.

The St. Paul campus is home to the College of Design's Department of Design, Housing, and Apparel (DHA). Located in McNeal Hall, DHA includes the departmental disciplines of apparel design, graphic design, housing studies, interior design, and retail merchandising. McNeal Hall, named for Wylle B. McNeal, the third head of home economics at Minnesota, is also the home to the university's Goldstein Museum of Design.

The St. Paul campus is known to University students and staff for the Meat and Dairy Salesroom, which sells animal food products (such as ice cream, cheese, and meat) produced in the university's state-certified pilot plant by students, faculty and staff.

The St. Paul campus borders the Minnesota State Fairgrounds, which hosts the largest state fair in the United States by daily attendance. The fair lasts 12 days, from late August through Labor Day. The grounds also serve a variety of functions during the rest of the year.

Although the Falcon Heights area code is 651, the university telephone system trunk lines use Minneapolis exchanges and its 612 area code.

=== Commuting ===
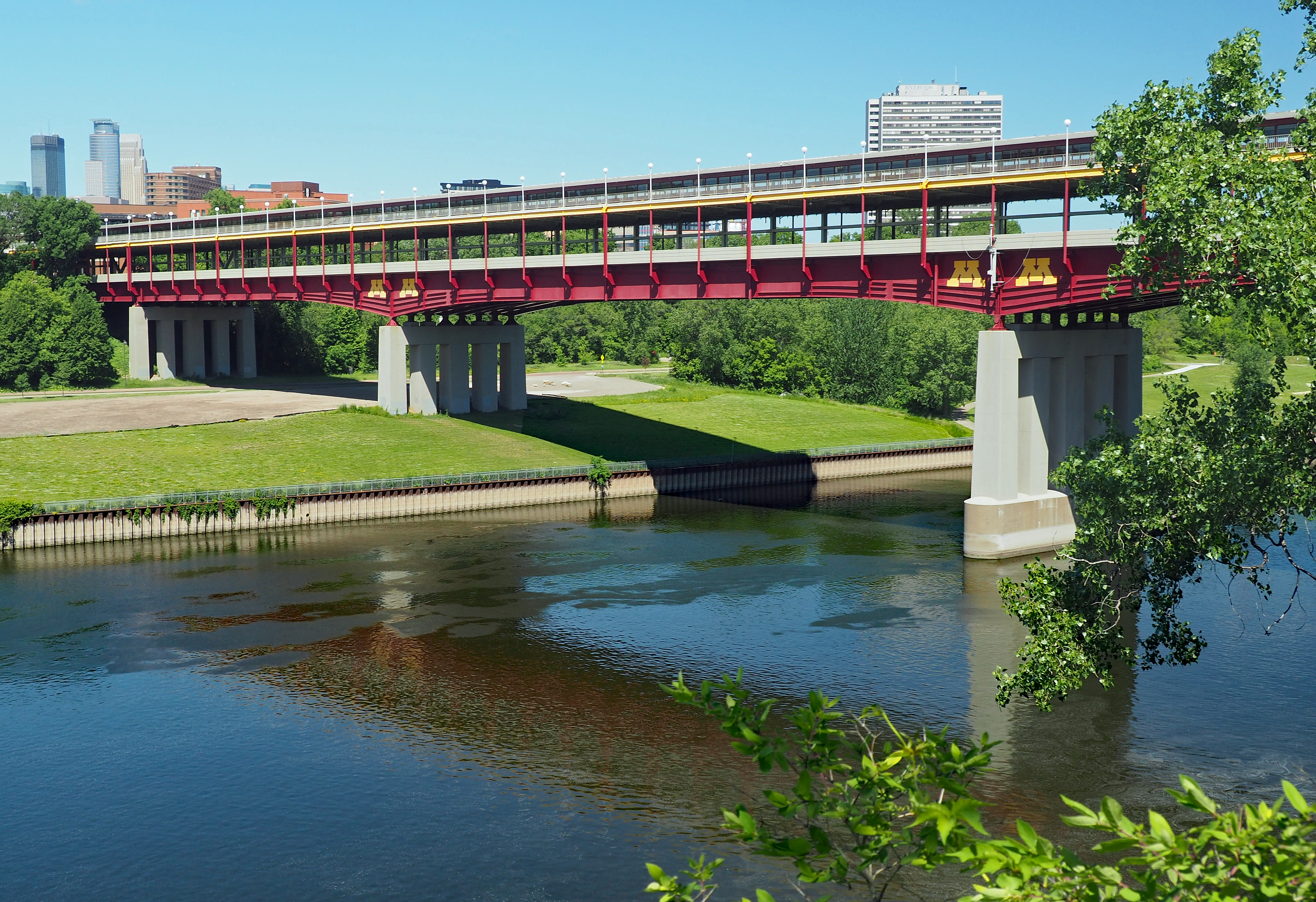
The Washington Avenue Bridge connects the East Bank and West Bank portions of the Minneapolis campus.

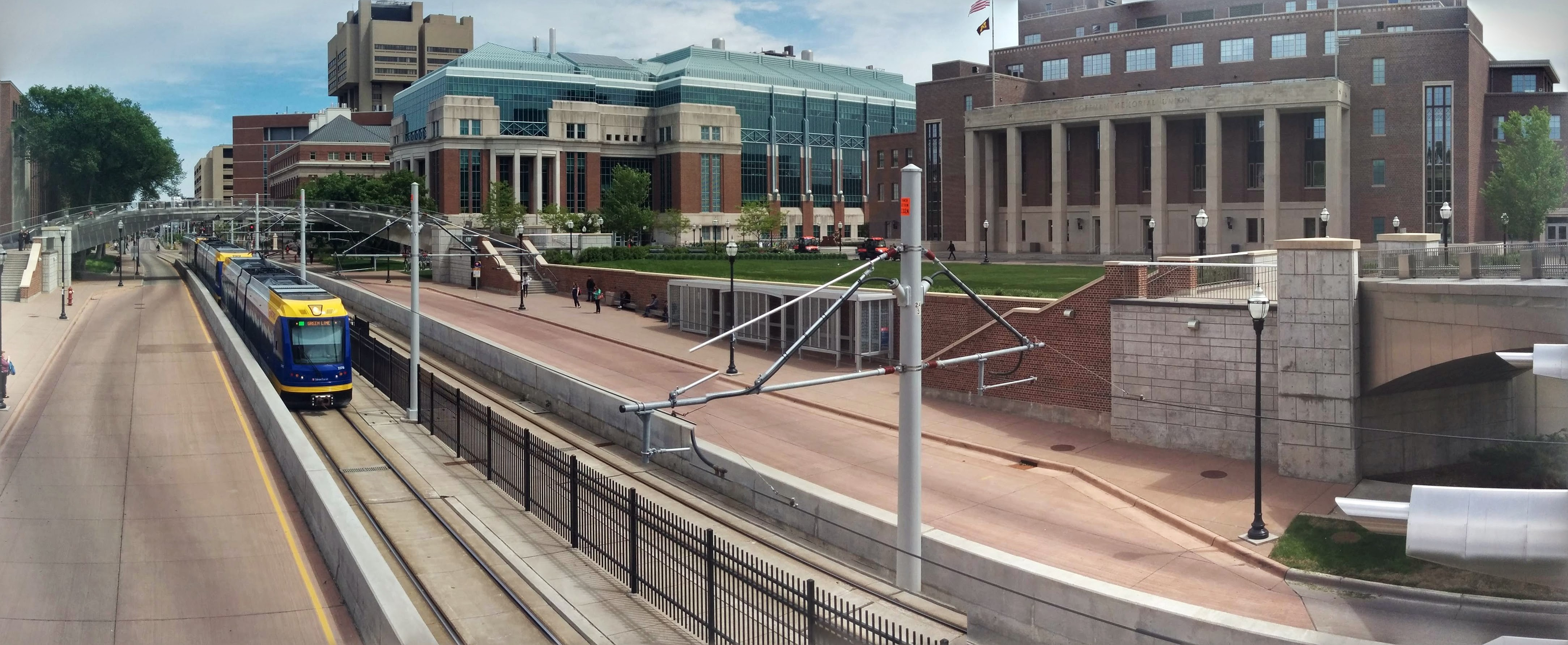
A Green Line train after leaving the East Bank Station, heading towards Downtown Minneapolis

Walking and riding bicycles are the most common modes of transportation among students. At times, the University Police has occasionally cited individuals for jaywalking or riding bicycles on restricted sidewalks in areas surrounding the university.

The Washington Avenue Bridge crossing the Mississippi River provides access between the East and West Banks in Minneapolis, on foot and via designated bike lanes and a free shuttle service. Several pedestrian tunnels ease the passage from building to building during harsh weather; they are marked with signs reading "The Gopher Way". The Minneapolis campus is near Interstates 94 and 35W and is bordered by the Minneapolis neighborhoods of Dinkytown (on the north), Cedar-Riverside (on the west), Stadium Village (on the southeast), and Prospect Park (on the east).

On regular weekdays during the school year, the Campus Connectors operate with schedule-less service as often as every five minutes during the busiest parts of the school day (between 7 am and 5:30 pm), slowing to once every 15 or 20 minutes during earlier or later hours. The estimated commute time between St. Paul and the East Bank is 15 minutes.

In 2008, the system carried 3.55 million riders. Although the shuttle service is free, it is comparatively inexpensive to operate; with an operating cost of $4.55 million in 2008, the operating subsidy was only $1.28 per passenger. Even Metro Transit's busy Metro Blue Line light rail required a subsidy of $1.44 that year, and that was with many riders paying $1.75 or more for a ride.

Three light-rail stations serve the university along the Green Line: Stadium Village, East Bank, and West Bank. The university partnered with Metro to offer students, staff, and faculty members a Campus Zone Pass that enables free travel on the three stations that pass through campus, as well as a discounted unlimited pass for students. More recently, the university has instituted the Universal Transit Pass, which allows most students unlimited access to the Metro Transit light rail and bus networks as well as a number of other transit systems in the area.

=== Campus safety ===
The Step Up campaign is a program that helps students prevent excessive drinking, as well as sexual assault and other crimes, by teaching them how to intervene and prevent in a positive way. This is done, in part, by explaining the bystander effect. The U of M also has a SAFE-U emergency notification text messaging system that sends out a notification to all faculty, staff, and students in case of emergency. The commitment to a safe inclusive campus is also articulated through the comprehensive University of Minnesota Safety Plan, aligned with MPact 2025's Commitment 5, Action Item 5.4, emphasizing the need to assess and improve campus safety continually.

The establishment of the Strategic Safety Advisory Committee and public safety forums fosters community engagement and dialogue on safety concerns and improvements. The university has made strides in off-campus safety through nightly patrols in Dinkytown and the introduction of blue light kiosks and mobile light trailers to enhance visibility and security. Other resources help students get home safely. Calling 624-WALK secures an escort for walks to adjacent campuses and neighborhoods, and Gopher Chauffeur, a van service, offers rides near and on campus. Both are free and open to all students, staff, and faculty.

The campus has nearly 200 automated external defibrillators (AEDs) and 200 yellow phones for emergency-only calls. The University Police Station has 20 Code Blue phones around campus that immediately connect people to their office. There are over 2,000 security cameras being monitored 24 hours a day. The university maintains a vigilant stance on cybersecurity, conducting annual external assessments and updating strategies for risk mitigation. Emergency preparedness is a key focus, with updated Emergency Operations Plans and disaster recovery protocols ensuring readiness for a variety of potential threats.

==== Sexual assaults ====
Minnesota Gophers football player Dominic Jones was convicted of sexual assault in 2008. In July 2009, an appeals court upheld Jones' conviction, but reduced his four-year prison sentence to one year. More than 1,000 sexual assaults on campus were reported between 2010 and 2015. No prosecutions for rape occurred, according to Katie Eichele of the Aurora Center, until the conviction of Daniel Drill-Mellum in 2016, for the rapes of two fellow students. Drill-Mellum received a six-year prison sentence.

It has been alleged that few sexual assaults on campus are reported to University police. Six resulted in arrest from 2010 to 2015; one was determined to be unfounded. In a study by campus police, in the years between 2005 and 2015, sexual assaults at the university remained the same or increased despite six sexual assault resources and many anti-crime programs on campus. In August 2020, the University of Minnesota agreed to pay $500,000 to a woman who in the fall of 2016, accused several Gophers football players of sexually assaulting her. In February 2017, a University of Minnesota panel cleared four of the 10 Gopher football players the woman accused and agreed with investigators' recommendation that four other players be expelled and the other two players should be suspended for a year.

== Academics ==
The university is organized into 19 colleges, schools, and other major academic units:

- Center for Allied Health Programs
- College of Biological Sciences
- College of Continuing and Professional Studies
- School of Dentistry
- College of Design
- College of Education and Human Development
- College of Food, Agricultural and Natural Resource Sciences
- Graduate School
- Law School
- College of Liberal Arts
- Carlson School of Management
- Medical School
- School of Nursing
- College of Pharmacy
- Hubert H. Humphrey School of Public Affairs
- School of Public Health
- College of Science and Engineering
- College of Veterinary Medicine

Six university-wide interdisciplinary centers and institutes work across collegiate lines:

- Center for Cognitive Sciences
- Consortium on Law and Values in Health, Environment, and the Life Sciences
- Institute for Advanced Study, University of Minnesota
- Institute for Engineering in Medicine
- Institute for Translational Neuroscience
- Institute on the Environment
- Minnesota Population Center

The university (system-wide) offers 154 undergraduate degree programs, 24 undergraduate certificates, 307 graduate degree programs, and 79 graduate certificates. The university offers the majority of these programs and certificates at its Twin Cities campus. The university has all three branches of the Reserve Officer Training Corps (ROTC). The Twin Cities campus, as well as the campuses at Crookston, Duluth, Morris, and Rochester, are accredited by the Higher Learning Commission (HLC). The university has been included on the list of Public Ivies. (Note: Sources identify the University of Minnesota as one of the Public Ivy institutions: Moll (1985, pp. 61–83); Greene & Greene (2001, p. 148); Gelber (2011, p. 177); Domina et al. (2019, p. 293))

=== Admissions ===
Undergraduate admissions statistics
- 2024 entering class

Test scores middle 50%^{[i]}
- SAT Total: 1350–1500
- ACT Composite: 27–33

High school GPA
- Average: 3.52–3.96

For fall 2025 admissions, Minnesota received over 43,000 applications for a freshman class of roughly 7,100 students. Although its acceptance rate has risen in recent years, Minnesota still characterizes admission to the university as "highly competitive."

Of the 50% of enrolled freshmen in 2024 who submitted ACT scores; the middle 50 percent Composite score was between 27 and 33. Of the 50% of the incoming freshman class who submitted SAT scores; the middle 50 percent Composite scores were 1350–1500.

The University of Minnesota is a college sponsor of the National Merit Scholarship Program and sponsored 97 Merit Scholarship awards in 2020. In the 2020–2021 academic year, 112 freshman students were National Merit Scholars.

=== Rankings ===
Academic rankings

National
- Forbes: 69
- U.S. News & World Report: 53
- Washington Monthly: 25
- WSJ/College Pulse: 85

Global
- ARWU: 47
- QS: 210
- THE: 87 (tie)
- U.S. News & World Report: 72 (tie)

National program rankings
Program	Ranking
Audiology	15
Biological Sciences	35
Biostatistics	11
Business	32
Chemistry	22
Clinical Psychology	9
Computer Science	38
Earth Sciences	25
Economics	20
Education	26
Engineering	36
English	40
Fine Arts	62
Health Care Management	3
History	31
Law	22
Mathematics	16
Medical Schools: Primary Care	Tier 1
Medical Schools: Research	Tier 2
Nursing: Anesthesia	49
Nursing: Midwifery	4
Occupational Therapy	59
Pharmacy	11
Physical Therapy	34
Physics	28
Political Science	27
Psychology	14
Public Affairs	9
Public Health	14
Social Work	51
Sociology	22
Speech-Language Pathology	22
Statistics	22
Veterinary Medicine	16

Global program rankings
Program	Ranking
Agricultural Sciences	53
Arts & Humanities	110
Biology & Biochemistry	95
Cardiac & Cardiovasular Systems	36
Chemistry	93
Clinical Medicine	67
Computer Science	138
Economics & Business	40
Electrical & Electronic Engineering	229
Engineering	179
Environment/Ecology	15
Geosciences	72
Immunology	57
Materials Science	217
Mathematics	62
Microbiology	38
Molecular Biology & Genetics	74
Neuroscience & Behavior	67
Oncology	136
Pharmacology & Toxicology	142
Physics	85
Plant & Animal Science	23
Psychiatry/Psychology	30
Social Sciences & Public Health	41
Space Science	59
Surgery	44

In 2024, Minnesota was ranked as the 26th best university in the United States by the Academic Ranking of World Universities, and 25th in the United States in Washington Monthly's 2021 National University Rankings. Minnesota's undergraduate program was ranked 53rd among national universities by U.S. News & World Report for 2023, and 23rd in the nation among public colleges and universities. The same publication ranked Minnesota's graduate Carlson School of Management as 28th in the nation among business schools, and 6th in the nation for its information systems graduate program. Other graduate schools ranked highly by U.S. News & World Report for 2022 include the University of Minnesota Law School at 22nd, the University of Minnesota Medical School, which was 4th for family medicine and 5th for primary care, the University of Minnesota College of Pharmacy, which ranked 3rd, the Hubert H. Humphrey School of Public Affairs, which ranked 9th, the University of Minnesota College of Education and Human Development, which ranked 10th for education psychology and special education, and the University of Minnesota School of Public Health, which ranked 10th.

In 2020, the Center for Measuring University Performance ranked Minnesota 16th in the nation in terms of total research, 30th in endowment assets, 24th in annual giving, 28th in the number of National Academies of Sciences, Engineering and Medicine memberships, 9th in its number of faculty awards, and 14th in its number of National Merit Scholars. Minnesota is listed as a "Public Ivy" in 2001 Greenes' Guides The Public Ivies: America's Flagship Public Universities.

In 2021, the University of Minnesota was ranked as the 40th best university in the world by the Academic Ranking of World Universities (ARWU), which assesses academic and research performance. The same 2021 ranking by subject placed the University of Minnesota's ecology program as 2nd best in the world, management program as 10th best, biotechnology program as 11th best, mechanical engineering and medical technology programs as 14th best, law and psychology programs as 19th best, and veterinary sciences program as 20th best. The Center for World University Rankings (CWUR) for 2021–22 ranked Minnesota 46th in the world and 26th in the United States. The 2021 Nature Index, which assesses the institutions that dominate high-quality research output, ranked Minnesota 53rd in the world based on research publication data from 2020. U.S. News & World Report ranked Minnesota as the 47th best global university for 2021. The 2015 Times Higher Education World University Rankings placed Minnesota 46th worldwide, based primarily on teaching, research, knowledge transfer, and international outlook.

== Research ==
Inventions by University of Minnesota students and faculty have ranged from food science to health technologies. Most of the public research funding in Minnesota is funneled to the University of Minnesota as a result of long-standing advocacy by the university itself.

The university developed Gopher, a precursor to the World Wide Web which used hyperlinks to connect documents across computers on the internet. However, the version produced by CERN was favored by the public since it was freely distributed and could more easily handle multimedia webpages. The university also houses the Charles Babbage Institute, a research and archive center specializing in computer history. The department has strong roots in the early days of supercomputing with Seymour Cray of Cray supercomputers.

The university also became a member of the Laser Interferometer Gravitational-wave Observatory (LIGO) in 2007 and has led data analysis projects searching for gravitational waves — their existence was confirmed by scientists in February 2016.

Discoveries and innovation by faculty or alumni include:

- Puffed rice – Alexander P. Anderson performed work leading to the discovery of "puffed rice", a starting point for a new breakfast cereal later advertised as "Food Shot From Guns".
- Transistorized cardiac pacemaker – Earl Bakken founded Medtronic, where he developed the first external, battery-operated, transistorized, wearable artificial pacemaker in 1957.
- Green Revolution – Norman Borlaug was an agronomist who led initiatives worldwide that contributed to extensive increases in agricultural production termed the Green Revolution. Borlaug, often called "the father of the Green Revolution", is credited with saving over a billion people worldwide from starvation. Borlaug was awarded multiple honors for his work, including the Nobel Peace Prize, the Presidential Medal of Freedom, and the Congressional Gold Medal.
- ATP synthase – Paul D. Boyer elucidated the enzymatic mechanism for synthesis of the cellular "energy currency", adenosine triphosphate (ATP), leading to a Nobel Prize in Chemistry, 1997.
- Point-contact transistor – Walter Houser Brattain and John Bardeen, later joined by William Shockley, invented the point-contact transistor in December 1947. For their invention, the trio was awarded a Nobel Prize in Physics in 1956.
- Infusion pump – Henry Buchwald invented the world's first infusion port, peritoneovenous shunts, and specialty vascular catheters. He also invented the first implantable infusion pump, a precursor to implantable infusion pumps in use throughout the world today.
- Photosynthesis – Melvin Calvin discovered the Calvin cycle along with Andrew Benson and James Bassham; for this, he won the 1961 Nobel Prize in Chemistry.
- Ecology – Raymond Lindeman revolutionized ecology, primarily through his 1942 paper "Trophic Dynamic Aspect of Ecology", which described how energy and nutrients cycled through ecosystems.
- Supercomputer – Seymour Cray designed a series of computers that were the fastest in the world for decades, and founded Cray Research, which built many of these machines.
- Taconite – Edward Wilson Davis developed an engineering process to economically extract iron ore from hard taconite rocks, making taconite valuable as iron ore for the iron and steel industries.
- Cosmic rays – Phyllis S. Freier discovered the presence of heavy nuclei in cosmic rays, proving the similarity between the Solar System and the rest of the galaxy.
- U.S. aviation – Robert Rowe Gilruth led the development of flying qualities for airplanes, the use of rockets to achieve data at supersonic speeds, and the establishment of many of the nation's leading flight research and human space flight operations facilities.
- Bone marrow transplant – Robert A. Good in 1968 performed the first successful human bone marrow transplant between persons who were not identical twins and is regarded as a founder of modern immunology. In 2018 Minnesota Gov. Mark Dayton proclaimed August 24 as University of Minnesota Blood and Marrow Transplant Day.
- Gore-Tex – Robert Gore invented Gore-Tex materials in 1969.
- Disk drive – Reynold B. Johnson invented a method and machinery to score tests electronically.
- K-rations – Ancel Keys developed the rations for the U.S. military and also conducted dietary studies: the Minnesota Starvation Study and the Seven Countries Study.
- Synthetic rubber – Izaak Kolthoff developed the "cold process" for producing synthetic rubber, which he undertook under the U.S. synthetic rubber program during World War II.
- Cyclotron – Ernest Lawrence won the Nobel Prize for Physics 1939 for inventing and developing the cyclotron.
- Drosophila melanogaster – Edward Lewis won the Nobel Prize in Physiology or Medicine in 1995 for his work on the Drosophila bithorax complex of homeotic genes.
- Cardiac surgery – C. Walton Lillehei pioneered open-heart surgery, as well as numerous techniques, equipment, and prostheses for cardiothoracic surgery.
- POPmail – Mark P. McCahill led the development of the Gopher protocol, the effective predecessor of the World Wide Web; was involved in creating and codifying the standard for Uniform Resource Locators (URLs); and led the development of POPmail, one of the first e-mail clients, which had a foundational influence on later e-mail clients and the popularization of graphical user interfaces in Internet technologies more broadly.
- MMPI – Starke R. Hathaway and J. C. McKinley created the Minnesota Multiphasic Personality Inventory (MMPI), which was first published in 1943.
- Zatocoding – Calvin Mooers developed a mechanical system using superimposed codes of descriptors for information retrieval called Zatocoding, 1948.
- Atomic bomb – Edward P. Ney discovered cosmic ray heavy nuclei and solar proton events. After early work involving separating isotopes from uranium, he worked on the Manhattan Project.
- Atomic bomb – Alfred O. C. Nier devised a method to isolate the isotopes of uranium, a critical discovery in the atomic age. Nier worked with Kellex Corporation in New York City on the design and development of efficient and effective mass spectrographs for use in the Manhattan Project to build the atomic bomb in World War II. He designed most of the spectrographs used for monitoring uranium separations during the war.
- Atomic bomb – Frank Oppenheimer worked on uranium isotope separation in 1945 and joined the Manhattan Project.
- Biotechnology – Ronald L. Phillips was the first to generate whole corn plants from cells grown in culture, which laid the foundation for, and sparked, a new industry using cell-culture methods to genetically modify corn plants and other cereals. The corn cell line most widely used for genetic modification of corn has greatly accelerated the improvement of corn as food, feed, and fuel.
- Renewable energy – Lanny D. Schmidt designed a reactor to extract hydrogen from ethanol, offering the first real hope hydrogen could be a source of inexpensive and renewable energy.
- Biomimetics – Otto Schmitt invented the Schmitt trigger, the cathode follower, the differential amplifier, and the chopper-stabilized amplifier.
- NASA – Deke Slayton was one of the original NASA Mercury Seven astronauts and became NASA's first chief of the Astronaut Office. He served as NASA's director of flight crew operations, making him responsible for crew assignments at NASA, from November 1963 until March 1972. At that time, he was granted medical clearance to fly and was assigned as the docking module pilot of the 1975 Apollo–Soyuz Test Project, at age 51 becoming the oldest person to fly in space at the time.
- Bathythermograph – Athelstan Spilhaus fully developed the bathythermograph (BT) in 1938, an instrument he perfected that was of vital importance in World War II against the German U-boat. During the war, the BT became standard equipment on all U.S. Navy subs and vessels involved in antisubmarine warfare.
- CDC 6600 – James Thornton developed the CDC 6600, the world's first supercomputer, designed with Seymour Cray.
- Ziagen – Robert Vince worked on antiviral drug candidates at UMN, where he went on to develop carbocyclic nucleosides termed 'carbovirs.' This class of medicinal agents included the drug abacavir. Abacavir was commercialized by GlaxoSmithKline as Ziagen for the treatment of AIDS.
- US3D – Graham Candler pioneered the future of hypersonics research with the development of the US3D CFD code which builds off of NASA's DPLR code, but uses unstructured grids and has many advanced numerical capabilities and physical models for multi-physics, highly coupled problems.
- Heart-lung transplant - Norman Shumway paved the way in organ transplantation, being the first to perform an adult human to human heart transplant and a heart-lung transplant.

== Student life ==
Undergraduate demographics as of fall 2024
Race and ethnicity	Total
White	57%
Asian	13%
Black	10%
Hispanic	7%
International student	6%
Two or more races	5%
Unknown	2%
Economic diversity
Low-income (Note: The percentage of students who received an income-based federal Pell grant intended for low-income students.)	22%
Affluent (Note: The percentage of students who are a part of the American middle class at the bare minimum.)	78%

Among matriculants to the university, 66.8% are considered Minnesota residents and 33.2% are considered out-of-state residents. According to the University Office of Institutional Data and Research, as of fall 2023, there were 30,469 undergraduates at the University of Minnesota Twin Cities campus. Of that number, 6,736 were first-time, degree-seeking freshmen. There were 11,233 graduate students.

=== Greek life, professional and honor societies ===
The University of Minnesota has numerous fraternities and sororities. Including defunct branches, the Greek system numbers more than 200 organizations, approximately half of which operate today. The university's Greek societies include the residential academic and social chapters, including non-residential multicultural groups. The Greek system includes professional fraternities, Honor Societies, Religious and service Fraternities. Fraternities and sororities have built several historically significant "Fraternity Row" homes along University Ave. SE, 10th Ave. SE, 4th Street SE, and 5th Street SE, all in Minneapolis, or along Cleveland Ave. near the St. Paul campus.

As of June 2018, approximately 3,900 system members made up about 11% of the campus population. Minnesota hosts 38 academic fraternities, 20 academic sororities, 56 honors societies, 31 professional societies, and two service-focused chapters.

=== Media ===
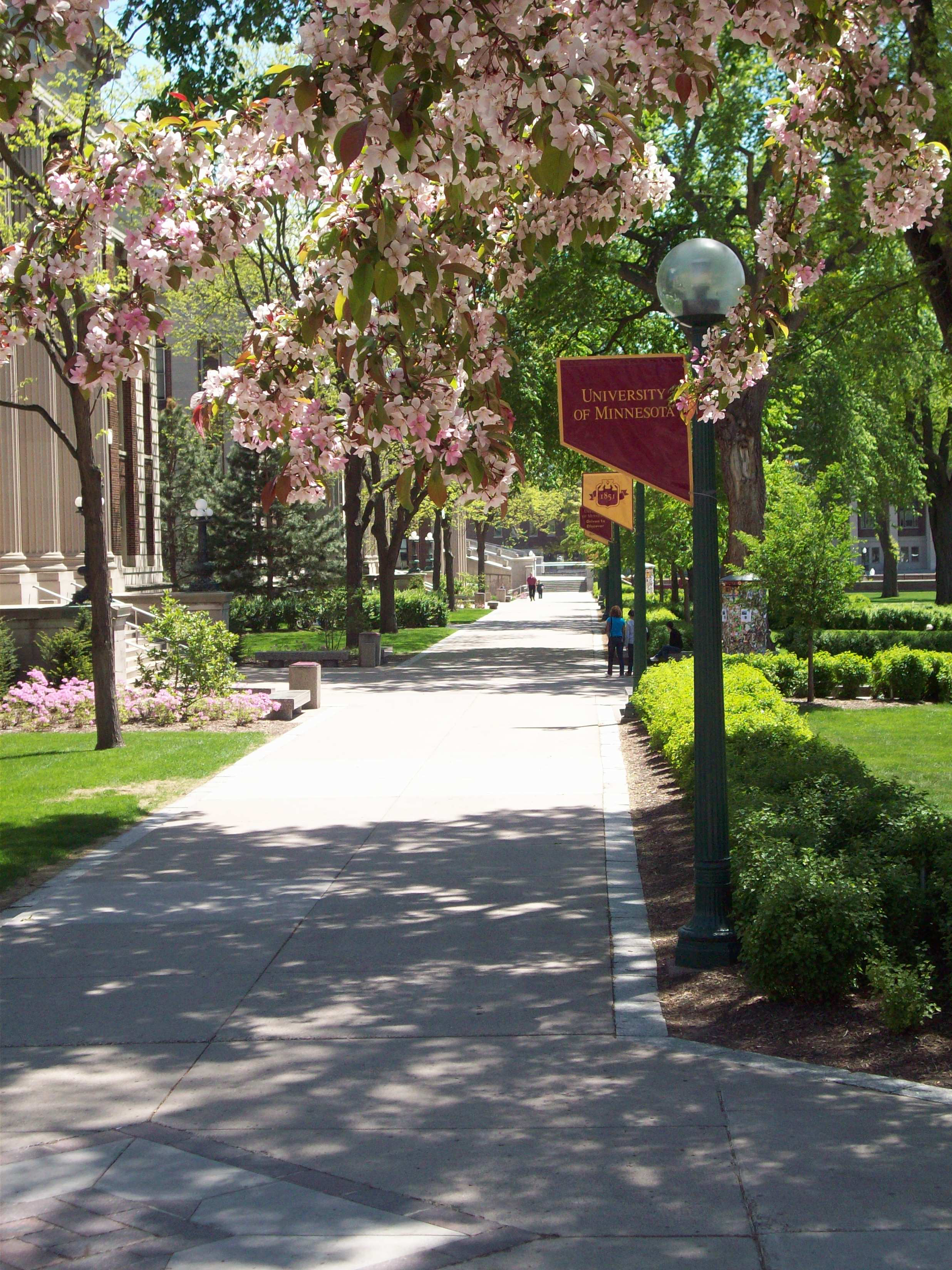
The eastern edge of the Northrop Mall, Spring 2008

==== Print ====
The Minnesota Daily has been published twice a week during the normal school season since the fall semester 2016. It is printed weekly during the summer. The Daily is operated by an autonomous organization run entirely by students. It was first published on May 1, 1900. Besides everyday news coverage, the paper has also published special issues, such as the Grapevine Awards, Ski-U-Mah, the Bar & Beer Guide, Sex-U-Mah, and others.

A long-defunct humor magazine, Ski-U-Mah, was published from about 1930 to 1950. It launched the career of novelist and scriptwriter Max Shulman.

A relative newcomer to the university's print media community is The Wake Student Magazine, a weekly that covers UMN-related stories and provides a forum for student expression. It was founded in November 2001 in an effort to diversify campus media and achieved student group status in February 2002. Students from many disciplines do all of the reporting, writing, editing, illustration, photography, layout, and business management for the publication. The magazine was founded by James DeLong and Chris Ruen. The Wake was named the nation's best campus publication (2006) by the Independent Press Association.

Additionally, the Wake publishes Liminal, a literary journal begun in 2005. Liminal was created in the absence of an undergraduate literary journal and continues to bring poetry and prose to the university community.

The Wake has faced a number of challenges during its existence, due in part to the reliance on student fees funding. In April 2004, after the Student Services Fees Committee had initially declined to fund it, the needed $60,000 in funding was restored, allowing the magazine to continue publishing. It faced further challenges in 2005, when its request for additional funding to publish weekly was denied and then partially restored.

In 2005 conservatives on campus began formulating a new publication named The Minnesota Republic. The first issue was released in February 2006, and funding by student service fees started in September 2006. The Republic is a biweekly newspaper run entirely by students, reporting on campus, state, and national news with commentary on sports, economics, and arts and entertainment.

The Republic is a member of the Collegiate Network, a program that includes over 100 publications at colleges and universities around the United States.

==== Radio ====
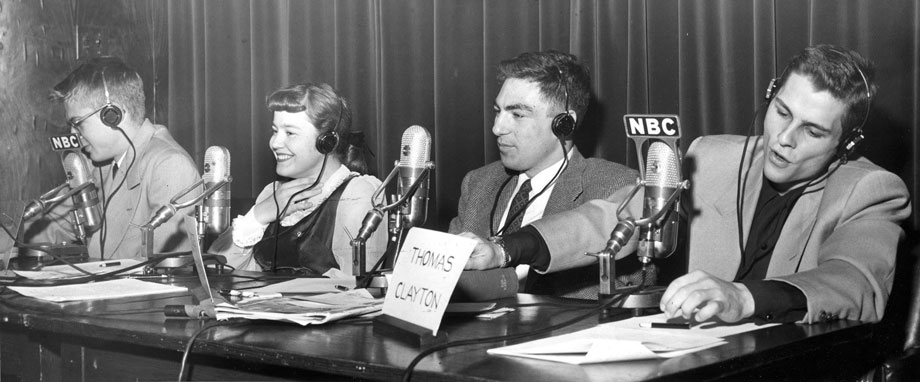
The University of Minnesota on the radio version of the College Bowl, c. 1953–54

The campus radio station, KUOM "Radio K", broadcasts an eclectic variety of independent music during the day on 770 kHz AM. Its 5,000-watt signal has a range of 80 mi (130 km), but shuts down at dusk because of Federal Communications Commission regulations. In 2003, the station added a low-power (8-watt) signal on 106.5 MHz FM overnight and on weekends. In 2005, a 10-watt translator began broadcasting from Falcon Heights on 100.7 FM at all times. Radio K also streams its content at www.radiok.org. With roots in experimental transmissions that began before World War I, the station received the first AM broadcast license in the state on January 13, 1922, and began broadcasting as WLB, changing to the KUOM call sign about two decades later. The station had an educational format until 1993, when it merged with a smaller campus-only music station to become what is now known as Radio K. A small group of full-time employees are joined by over 20 part-time student employees who oversee the station. Most of the on-air talent consists of student volunteers.

==== Television ====
Some television programs made on campus have been broadcast on local PBS station KTCI channel 17. Several episodes of Great Conversations have been made since 2002, featuring one-on-one discussions between University faculty and experts brought in from around the world. Tech Talk was a show meant to help people who feel intimidated by modern technology, including cell phones and computers.

=== Student Government ===
The Undergraduate Student Government advocates for student interests on local, state, and federal levels, and focuses on efforts that directly benefit the student population. It was instrumental in passing legislation in the 2013 Minnesota Legislature for medical amnesty.

The Council of Graduate Students and the Professional Student Government represent the interests of students in graduate and professional study programs, respectively. Formerly, they were represented by one organization known as the Graduate and Professional Student Assembly, which splintered in 2014.

=== Student activism ===
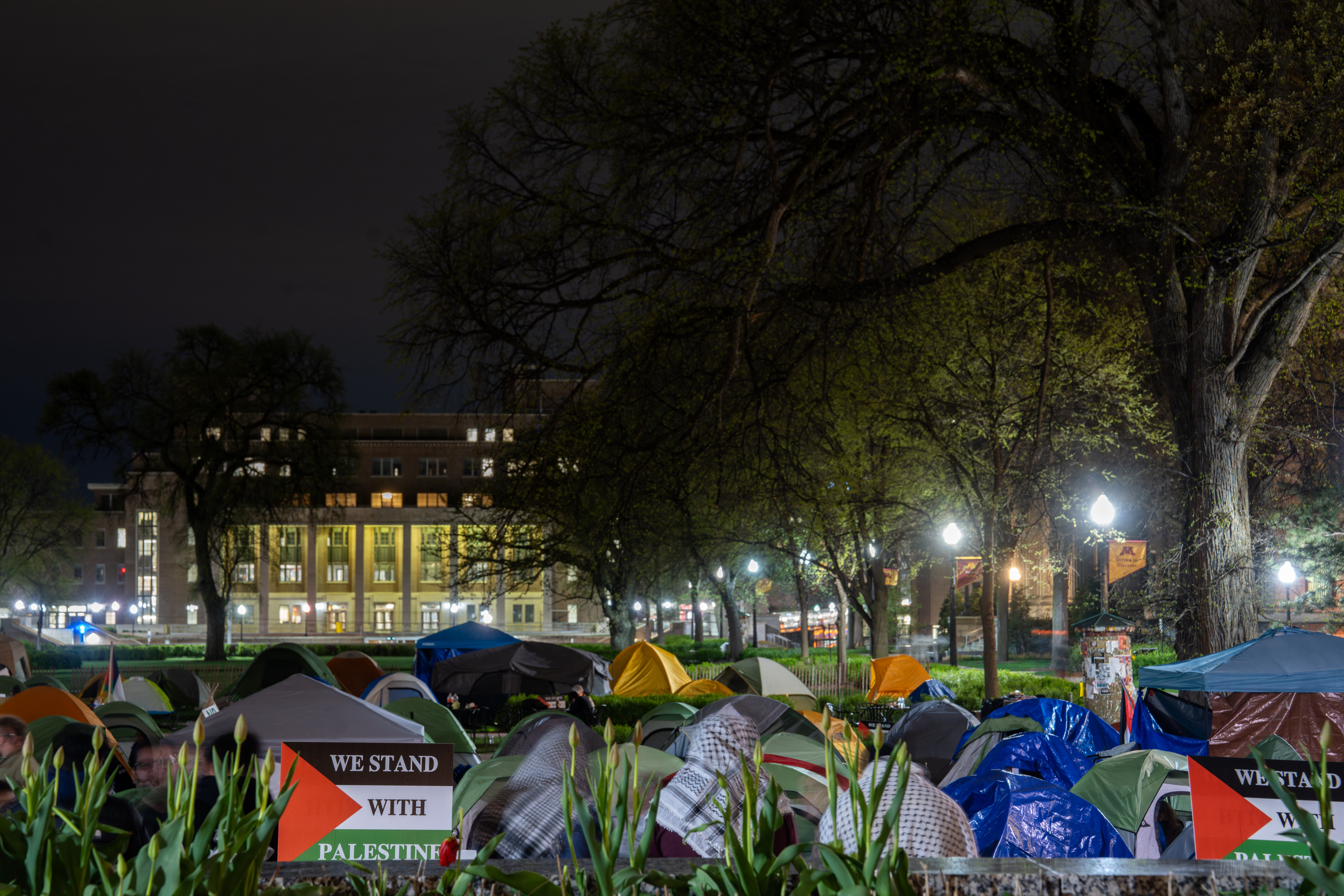
University of Minnesota pro-Palestinian encampment on May 1, 2024

Student activism has played an important role at the university, including campaigns to desegregate campus housing in the 1930s and 1940s, Black students' take over of Morrill Hall in 1969, which led to the creation of the Department of Afro-American Studies, now known as the Department of African-American and African Studies, the 1970 student strike against war, campaigns to keep the General College open in the 2000s, campaigns against racism in 2014–2015 known as Whose Diversity?, and many graduate student unionization efforts. For example, labor coalition efforts in the 2021–2022 academic year highlighted poor wages, poor stipend conditions, and administrative disrespect for graduate student workers. In the 2022–2023 academic year, labor efforts materialized into a campaign and a vote that culminated in the formation of the Graduate Labor Union-United Electrical (GLU-UE), the labor union currently representing graduate student workers at the University of Minnesota.

== Athletics ==
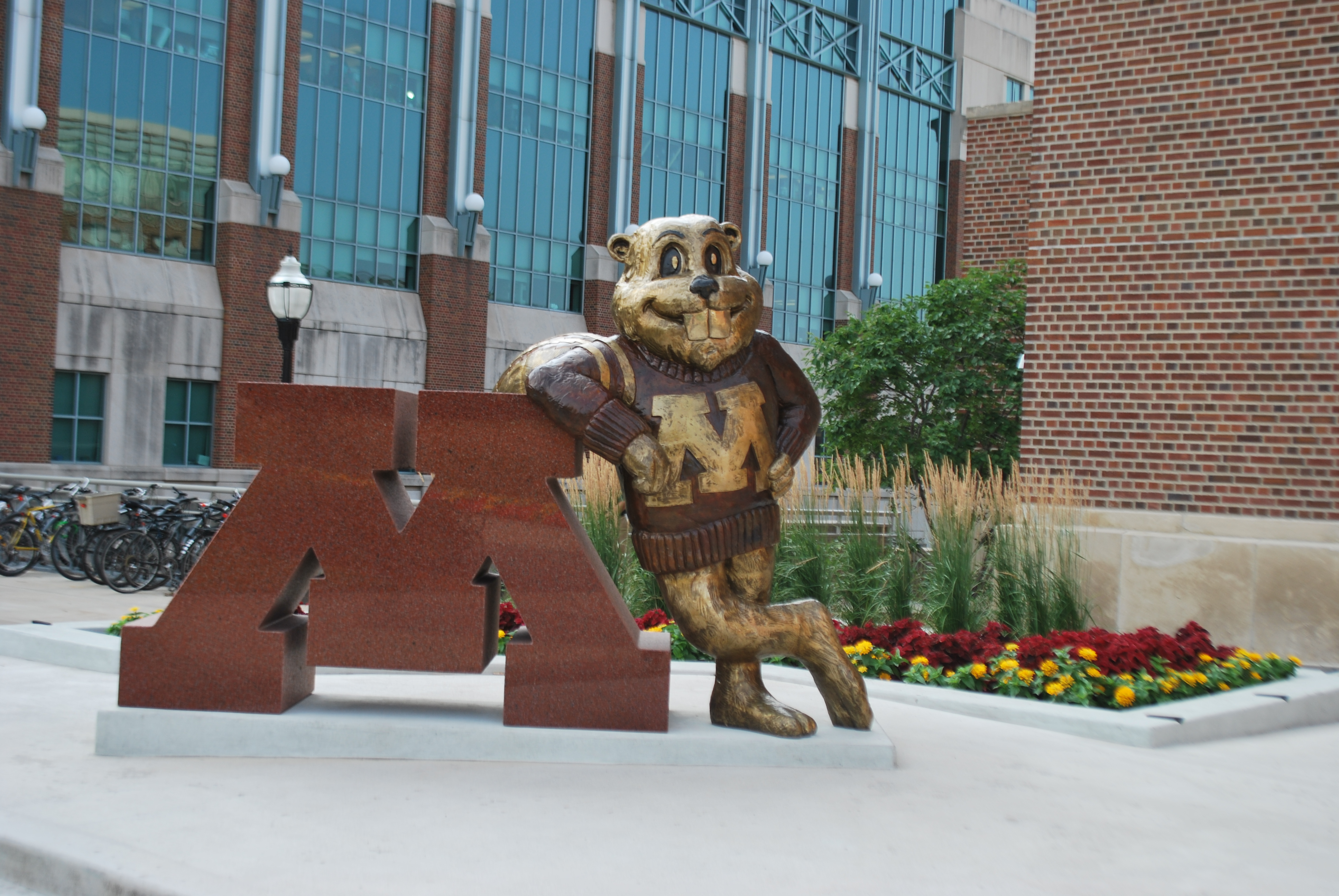
Goldy Gopher statue in front of Coffman Memorial Union

Minnesota's Twin Cities campus athletics teams are called the Minnesota Golden Gophers and are members of the Big Ten Conference and the Western Collegiate Hockey Association (WCHA) in the National Collegiate Athletic Association (NCAA). As of 2019, they have won 19 NCAA championships and claim six national football championships.

Since the 2013–14 school year, the only Minnesota team that does not compete in the Big Ten is the women's ice hockey team, which competes in the WCHA. The Gophers men's ice hockey team was a longtime WCHA member, but left when the Big Ten began operating a men's ice hockey league with six inaugural members. The current athletic director is Mark Coyle.

The Golden Gophers' most notable rivalry is the annual college football game against the Wisconsin Badgers for Paul Bunyan's Axe. The two universities also compete in the Border Battle, a year-long athletic competition in which each sport season is worth 40 points divided by the number of times the teams play each other (i.e. football is worth 40 points because they play each other only once, while women's ice hockey is worth 10 points per game because they play four times a year). Conference and postseason playoffs do not count in the point standings.

Goldy Gopher is the mascot for the Twin Cities campus and the associated sports teams. The gopher mascot is a tradition as old as the state, which was tabbed the "Gopher State" in 1857 after a political cartoon ridiculing the $5 million railroad loan that helped open up the West. The cartoon portrayed shifty railroad barons as striped gophers pulling a railroad car carrying the Territorial Legislature. Later, the university picked up the nickname with the first university yearbook, bearing the name "Gopher Annual", appearing in 1887.

The Minnesota Rouser is the university's fight song. It is commonly played and sung by the 320-member Minnesota Marching Band at events such as commencement, convocation, and athletic games. Other songs associated with the university include the Minnesota March, which was composed for the university by John Philip Sousa, and Hail! Minnesota, the university's alma mater and state song of Minnesota.

=== Football ===
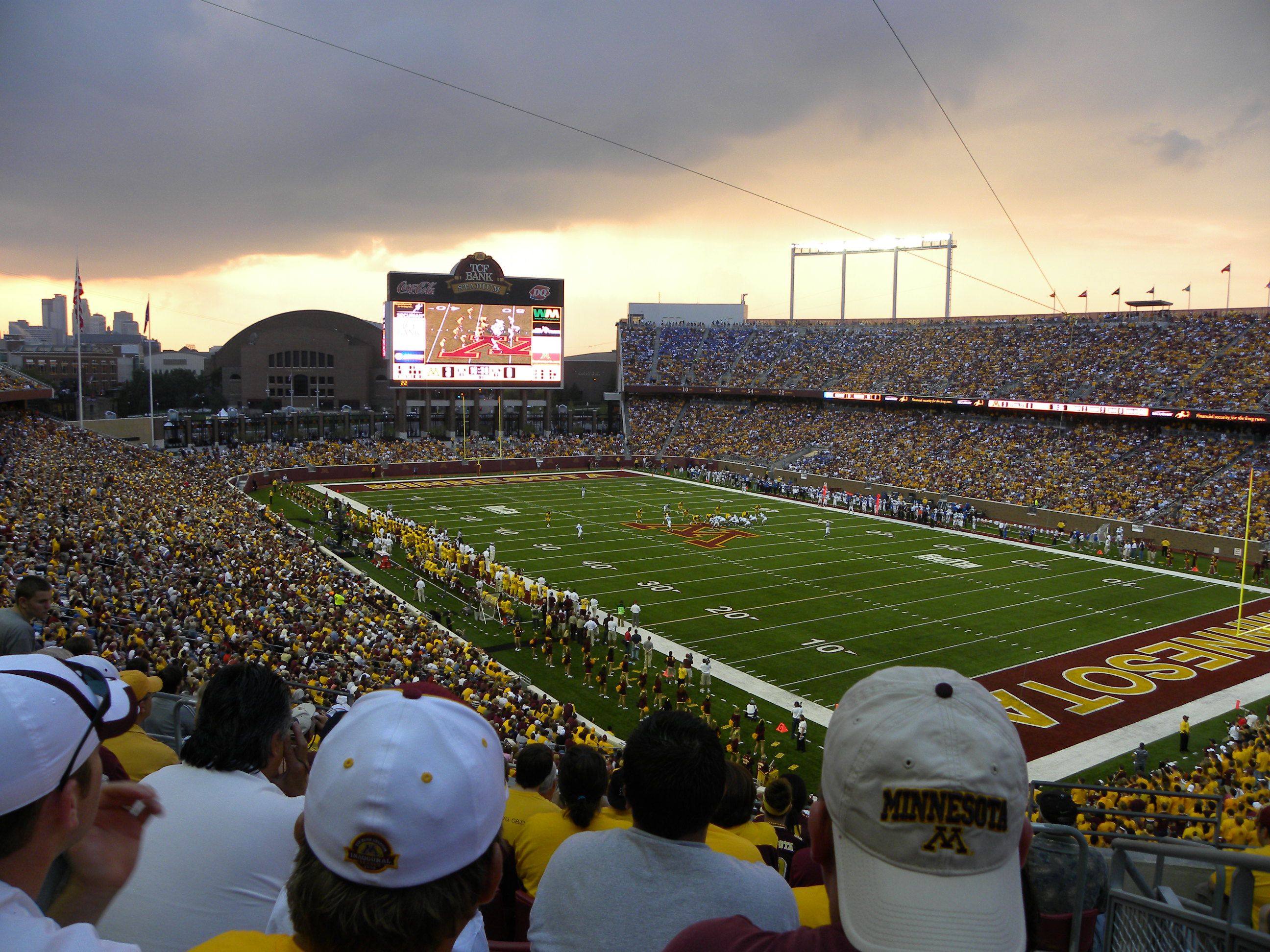
Huntington Bank Stadium replaced the Hubert H. Humphrey Metrodome as the Gophers' home stadium in 2009.

The Minnesota Golden Gophers are one of the oldest programs in college football history. They have won seven national championships and 18 Big Ten Conference Championships. The Golden Gophers played their first game on September 29, 1882, a 4–0 victory over Hamline University, St. Paul. In 1887, the Golden Gophers played host to the Wisconsin Badgers in a 63–0 victory. With the exception of 1906, the Golden Gophers and Badgers have played each other every year since. The 128 games played against each other make this the most played rivalry in NCAA Division I FBS college football.

The Golden Gophers achieved a three-peat national championship run from 1934 to 1936. To date, this remains the highest consecutive championship count in NCAA Division I FBS college football history.

In 1981, the Golden Gophers played their last game in Memorial Stadium. Between 1982 and 2008, the school played their home games in the Hubert H. Humphrey Metrodome in downtown Minneapolis. They moved back to campus on September 12, 2009, when their new home, TCF Bank Stadium, opened with a game against the Air Force Falcons of the U.S. Air Force Academy. Often referred to as The Bank, the stadium was renamed Huntington Bank Stadium in June 2021 to reflect the acquisition of TCF Bank by Huntington Bank.

=== Basketball ===
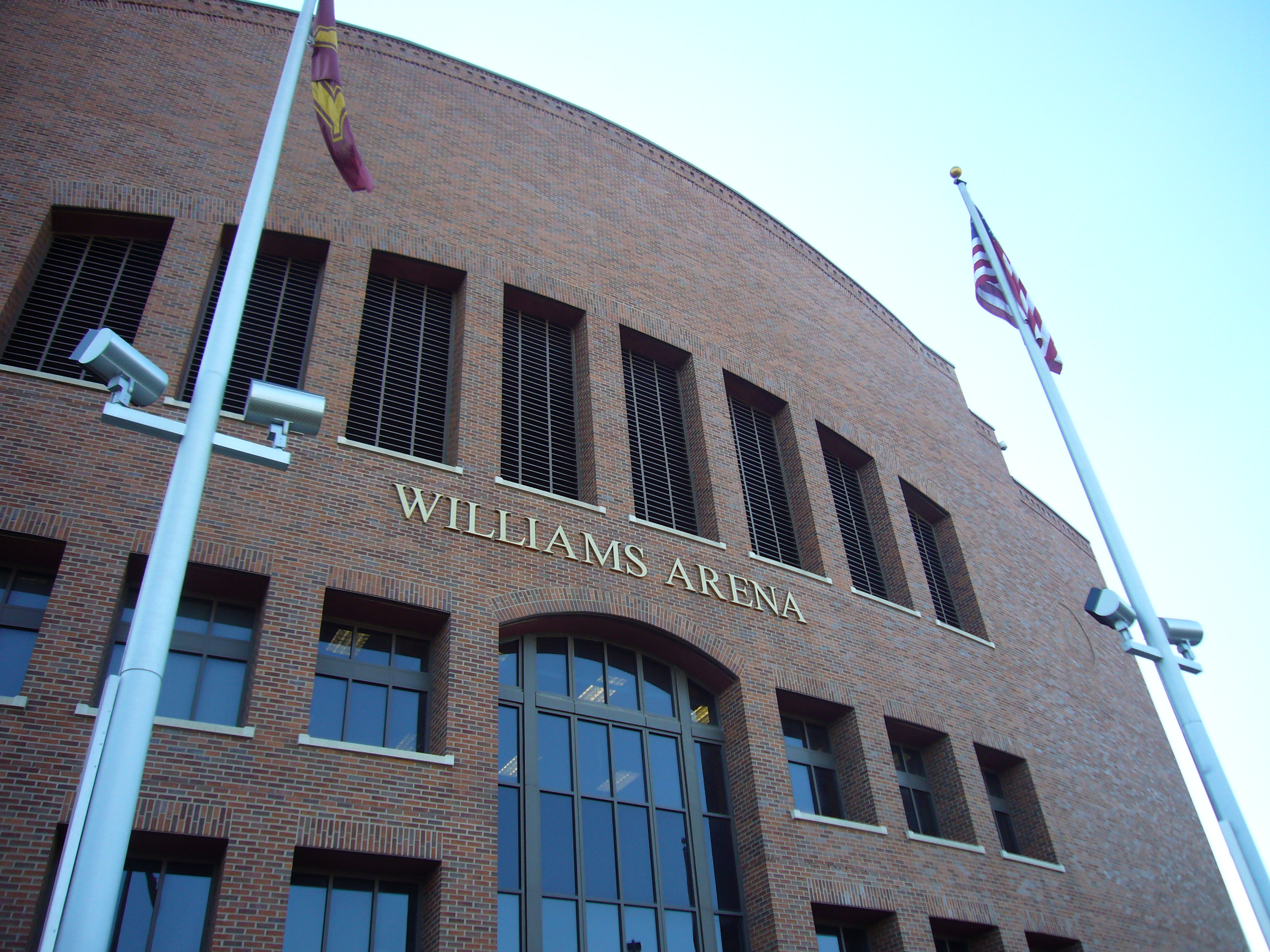
The Golden Gophers have played basketball home games in Williams Arena since 1928.

The Golden Gophers men's basketball team has won two National Championships, two National Invitation Tournament (NIT) Championships, and eight Big Ten Regular Season Championships. They also have fourteen NCAA Tournament appearances, including a Final Four appearance in 1997 and three Sweet 16 appearances. Overall the Golden Gophers have a 15–13 record in the NCAA tournament with their highest ranking being a 1 seed in 1997. However, because of NCAA sanctions for academic fraud, all postseason appearances from 1994 to 1998—in the NCAA Tournament in 1994, 1995, and 1997 and NIT in 1996 and 1998—were vacated. With these seasons removed, the Gophers have gone 9–10 in the NCAA tournament with a highest ranking of the 2 seed in 1984. In April 2014, the Golden Gophers defeated SMU to win the NIT championship at Madison Square Garden in New York City.

The Golden Gophers women's basketball team has enjoyed success in recent years under Pam Borton, including a Final Four appearance in 2004. The Golden Gophers have a 12–10 record in the NCAA tournament with their highest ranking being a 3 seed in 2005. Overall, they have ten NCAA Tournament appearances and three Sweet 16 appearances.

=== Hockey ===
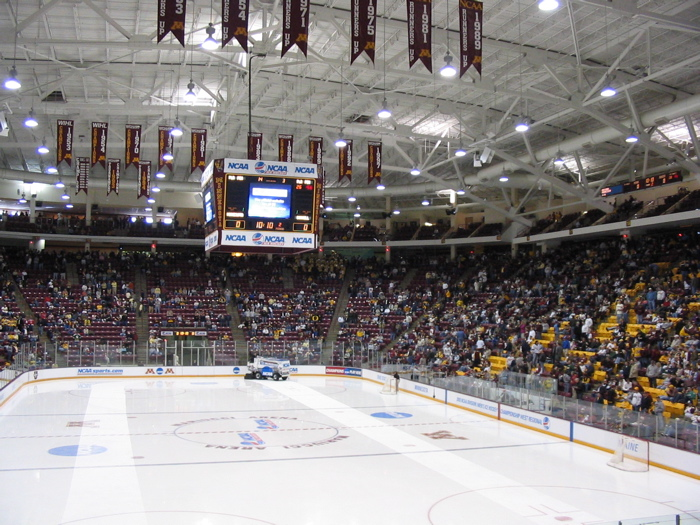
3M Arena at Mariucci is home to the men's ice hockey team.

The Golden Gophers men's hockey program has won five Division I National Championships, and 29 conference championships (including 22 WCHA and seven Big Ten Hockey season championships. They have won 14 WCHA Tournament Championships and have 23 NCAA Frozen Four appearances. Their most recent NCAA tournament run was in 2023, when they made it to the championship game, but lost to the Quinnipiac Bobcats. A former Golden Gophers hockey tradition was to fill a majority of the team roster with Minnesota natives. Home games are played at Mariucci Arena. The Golden Gophers' main rivals are the University of Wisconsin–Madison and the University of North Dakota.

The Golden Gophers women's hockey team has won six NCAA National Championships, most recently in 2016, and nine WCHA Regular Season Championships. They have also won seven WCHA Tournament Championships and have eleven NCAA Frozen Four appearances. They play their home games in Ridder Arena. They were the first collegiate women's hockey team to play in an arena dedicated solely to women's ice hockey. In the 2012–2013 season they finished undefeated at 41–0, and are the first and only NCAA women's hockey team to do so. After winning the NCAA tournament their winning streak stood at 49 games, dating back to February 17, 2012, when they lost to North Dakota.

=== Other sports ===
The Minnesota Golden Gophers baseball team boasts a storied history marked by championship success, particularly in the Big Ten Conference. Since its inception, the Golden Gophers have won 24 Big Ten championships with their most recent being in 2018. Along with Big Ten titles the Golden Gophers have made the College World Series 5fives times with a 17–7 record and three NCAA championships, the most recent being in 1964.

The first Division I collegiate women's rugby club in the state, the Golden Gophers women's rugby club team won the Midwest conference championship in 2015, 2016, and 2017.

The Golden Gophers women's gymnastics team competes in the Maturi Pavilion. The team has won nine Big Ten titles, the most recent in 2021. Along with nine Big Ten titles, the Golden Gophers have made the NCAA tournament six times, with their highest placement being 6th in 2022, with a total team score of 197.1125.

The cross country and track and field programs have produced several professional runners, including Ben Blankenship, Gabriele Grunwald, and Charlie Lawrence. They also host the Roy Griak meet, a large collegiate cross country meet.

== Notable people ==
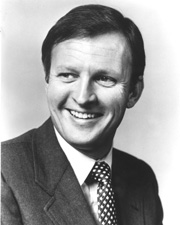
William L. Armstrong, businessman and U.S. senator from Colorado

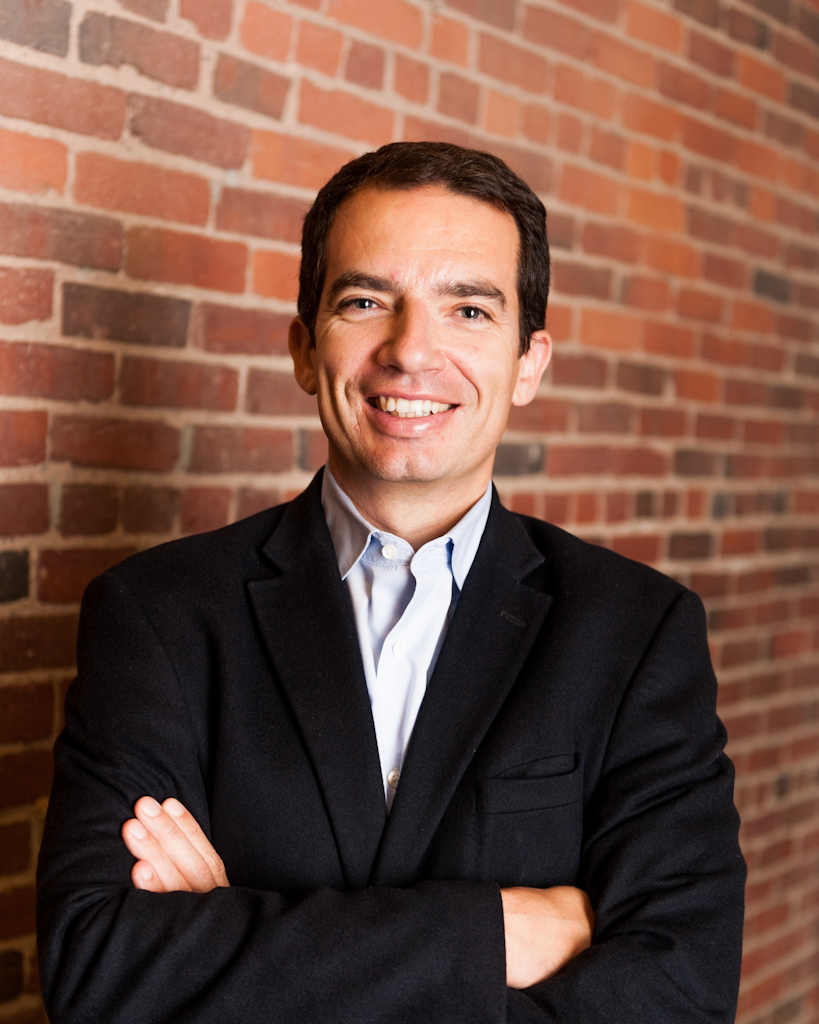
Stéphane Bancel, CEO of Moderna

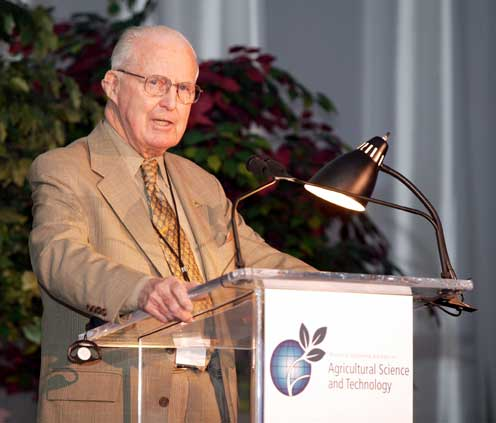
Norman Borlaug (B.S, Forestry, 1937; M.S. (1939) and Ph.D. (1942), Plant Pathology), 1970 Nobel Peace Prize

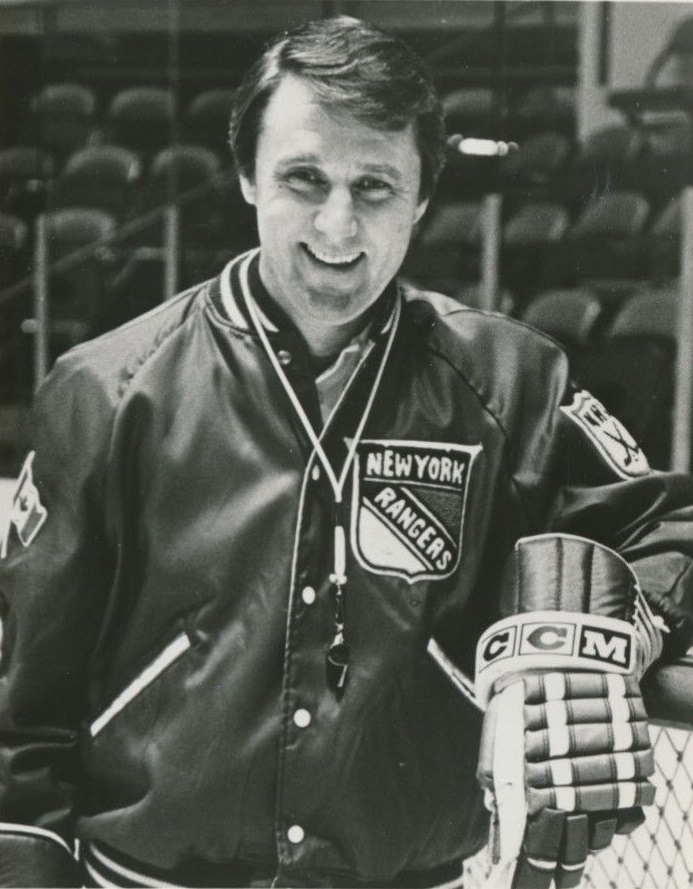
Herb Brooks (B.A., 1962), Olympic ice hockey coach

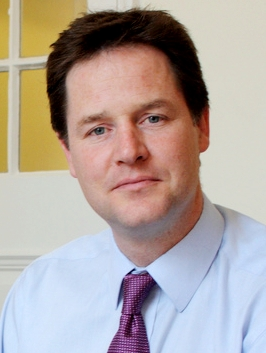
Nick Clegg (Fellow, 1989–90), deputy prime minister of the United Kingdom

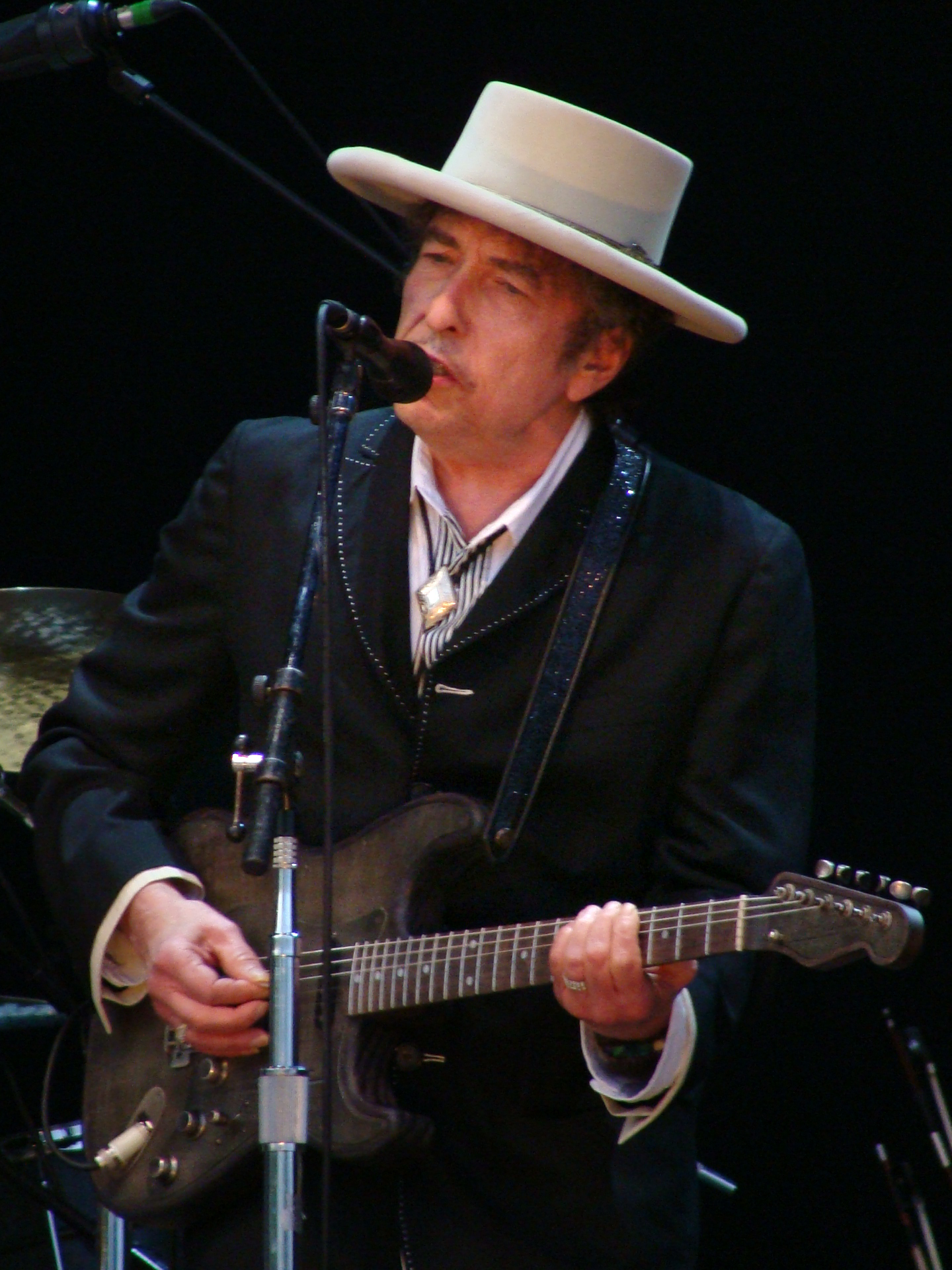
Bob Dylan (Literature & Arts, 1959–1960), 2016 Nobel Prize in Literature

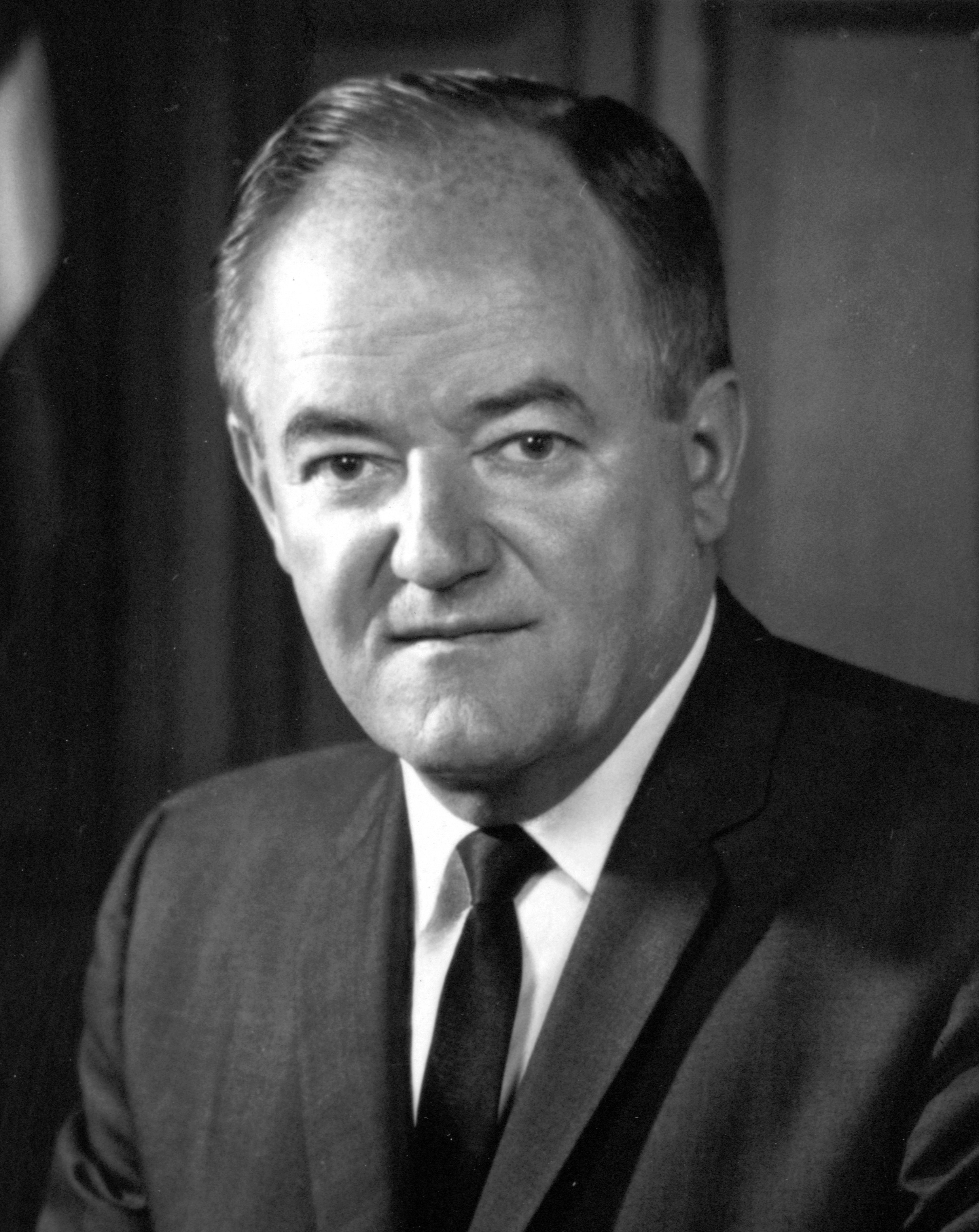
Hubert Humphrey (B.A., 1939), 38th vice president of the United States

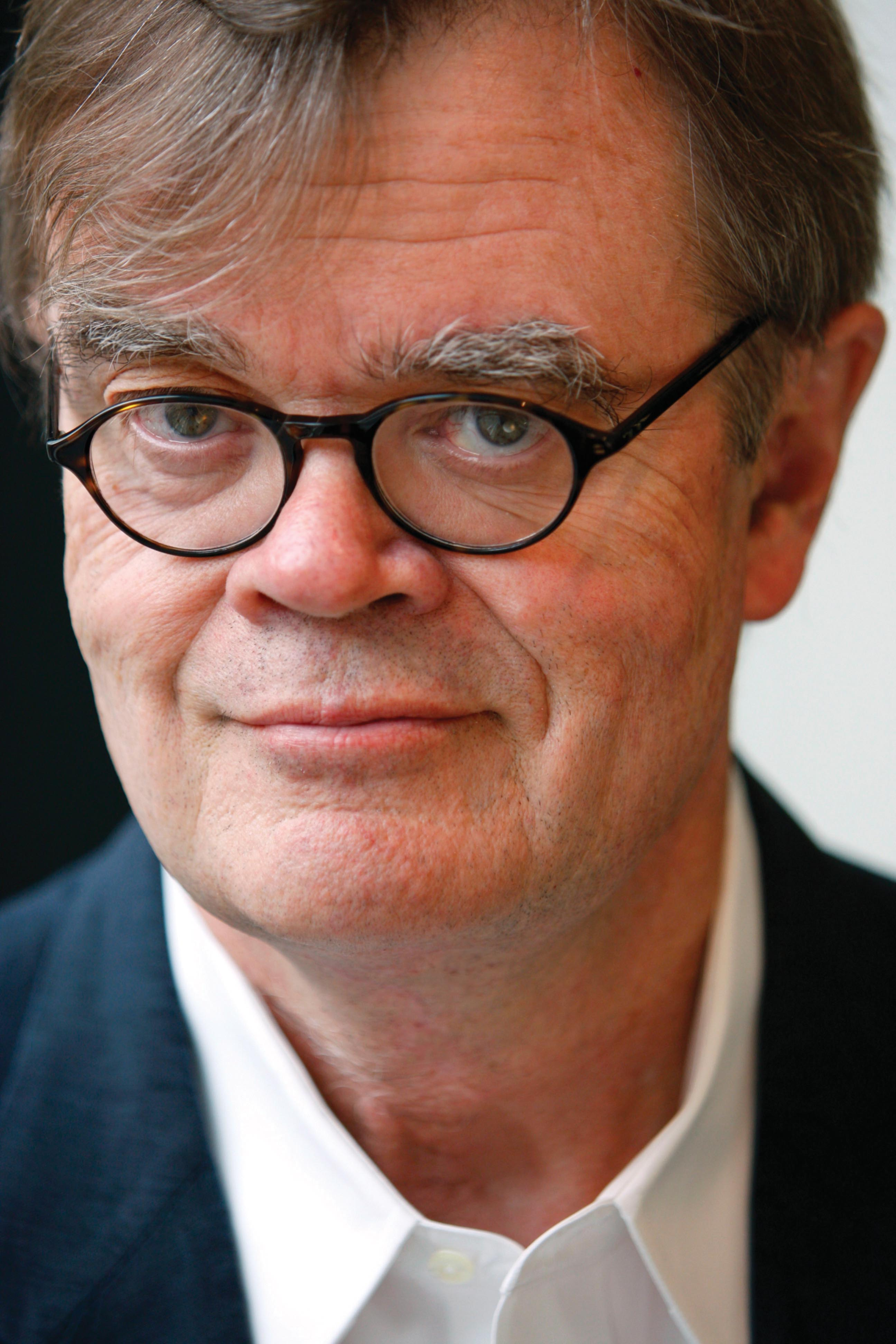
Garrison Keillor (B.S, English, 1966), author

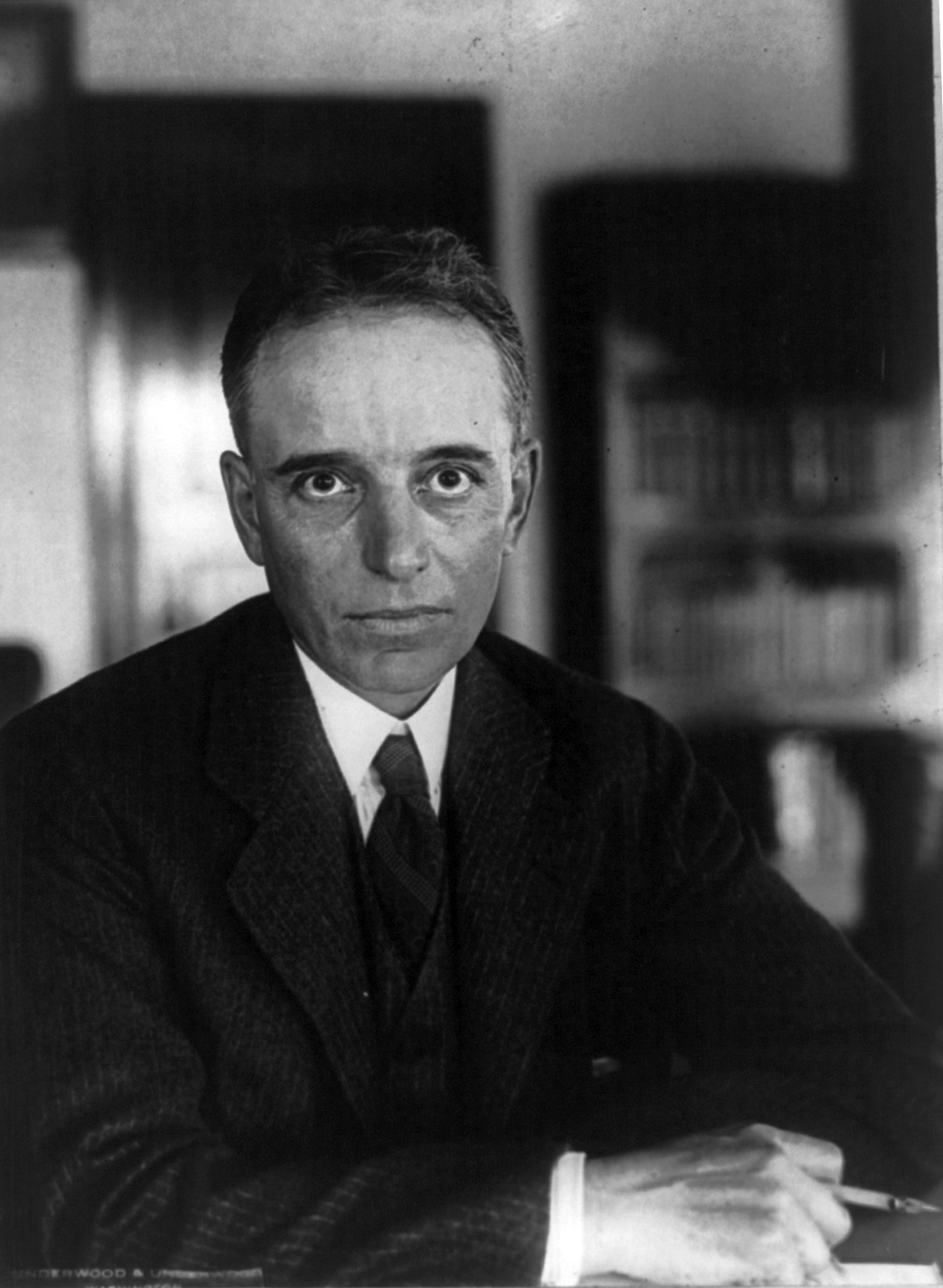
William D. Mitchell (A.B., 1895) Solicitor General of the United States and United States Attorney General

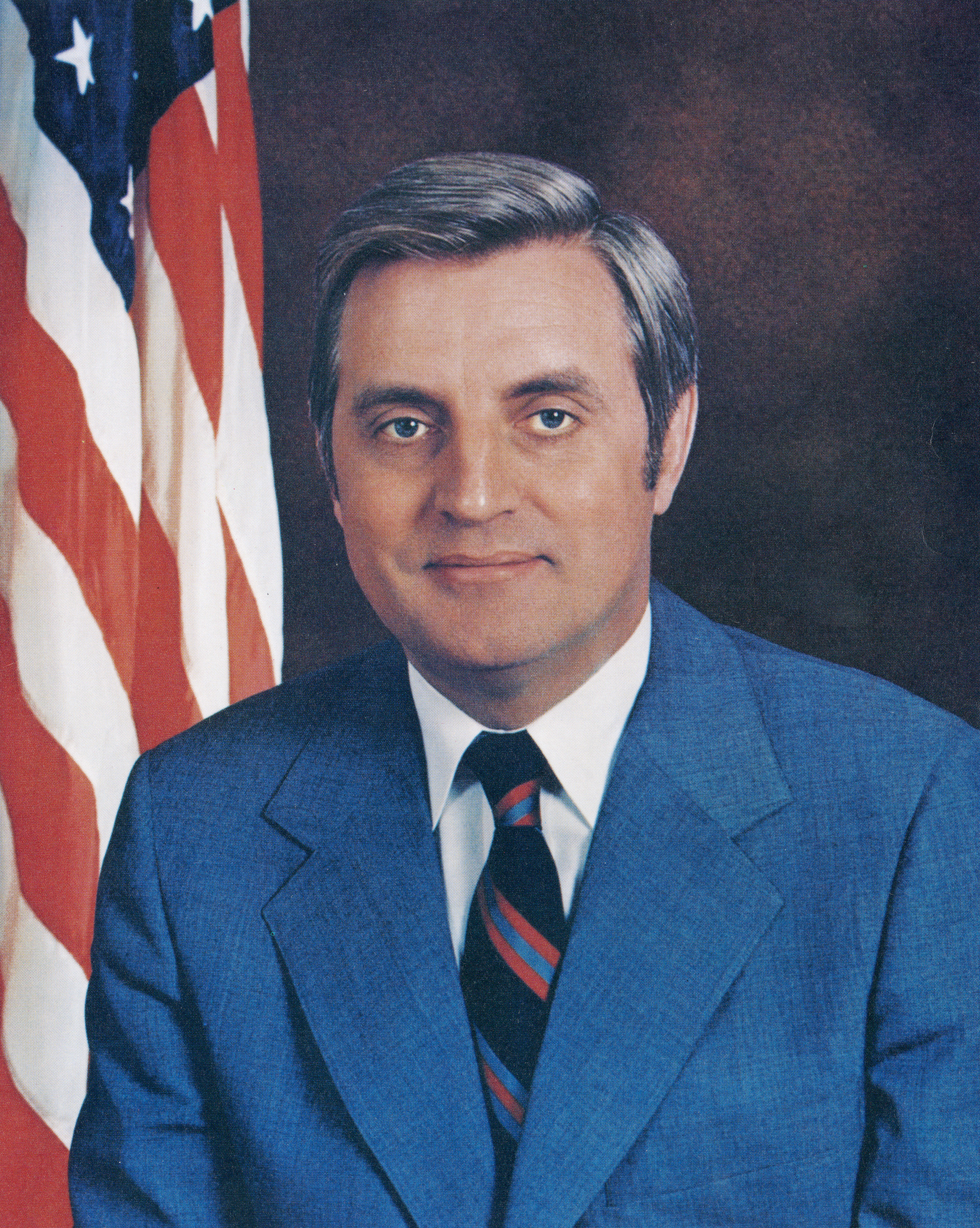
Walter Mondale (B.A., Political Science, 1951), 42nd vice president of the United States

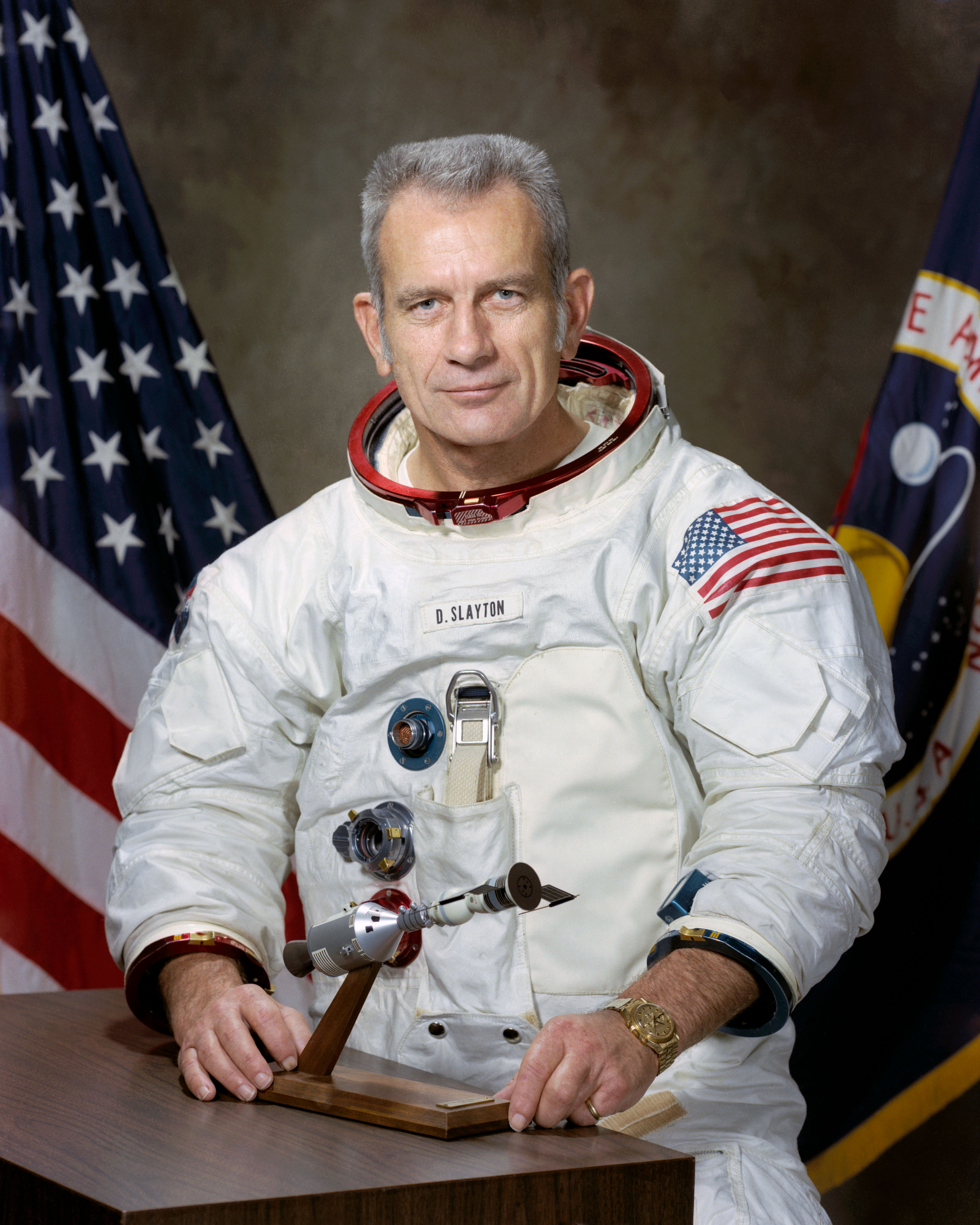
Deke Slayton (B.S., Aeronautical Engineering, 1949), Mercury Seven astronaut

== See also ==
- List of colleges and universities in Minnesota

== Sources ==
- Domina, Thurston; Gibbs, Benjamin G.; Nunn, Lisa; Penner, Andrew (2019). Education and Society: An Introduction to Key Issues in the Sociology of Education. Oakland, California: University of California Press. doi:10.2307/j.ctvpb3wn0. ISBN 978-0-520-29558-2. JSTOR j.ctvpb3wn0. LCCN 2019016592. OCLC 1100448713.
- Gelber, Scott M. (2011). The University and the People: Envisioning American Higher Education in an Era of Populist Protest. Madison, Wisconsin: University of Wisconsin Press. ISBN 978-0-299-28464-0. LCCN 2011011569. OCLC 711642396. S2CID 153173556.
- Moll, Richard W. (1985). The Public Ivys: A Guide to America's Best Public Undergraduate Colleges and Universities. New York: Viking. ISBN 978-0-670-58205-1. LCCN 83040659. OCLC 11755334. S2CID 153005227.
