= University of Minnesota College of Education and Human Development =

- Type: State university
- Established: 1905
- Dean: Michael C. Rodriguez
- Academic staff: 189 (Fall 2012)
- Administrative staff: 272 (Fall 2012)
- Students: 4,053 (2023-2024 academic year)
- Undergraduates: 2,315 (2023-2024 academic year)
- Postgraduates: 1,738 (2023-2024 academic year)
- Location: Minneapolis, Minnesota, USA
- Campus: Urban

The College of Education and Human Development (CEHD) is one of seventeen colleges and professional schools at the University of Minnesota. CEHD departments are located on both the East Bank and St. Paul campuses.

The college was founded in 1905 as the Department of Pedagogy. In 2006 the College of Education and Human Development became part of a newly organized college that now includes the former General College (Department of Postsecondary Teaching and Learning) and two units of the former College of Human Ecology (the School of Social Work and the Department of Family Social Science).

As of fall 2017 it enrolled 4,823 students. Living alumni total more than 70,000. The 2017 Academic Ranking of World Universities listed CEHD as the top public school of education in the world. U.S. News & World Report in its 2016 Best Grad School rankings rated University of Minnesota's CEHD No. 11 among public institutions and tied for twenty-first overall.

== Mission ==
The College of Education and Human Development is a leader in discovering, creating, sharing, and applying principles and practices of multiculturalism and multidisciplinary scholarship to advance teaching and learning and to enhance the psychological, physical, and social development of children, youth, and adults across the lifespan in families, organizations, and communities. The mission of the University of Minnesota College of Education and Human Development is to contribute to a just and sustainable future through engagement with the local and global communities to enhance human learning and development at all stages of the life span.

== Degrees granted ==
1,644 degrees granted during 2016-17 (760 B.S., 502 M.Ed., 382 masters and advanced graduate degrees). In addition, 387 students completed post baccalaureate teacher licensure.

== Administration ==
Michael C. Rodriguez is dean of the college.

== Departments ==
- Curriculum and Instruction
- Educational Psychology
- Family Social Science
- Institute of Child Development
- Organizational Leadership, Policy, and Development
- School of Kinesiology
- School of Social Work

== Research centers ==
- Center for Applied Research and Educational Improvement
- Center for Early Education and Development
- Institute on Community Integration
- Learning Technologies Media Lab
- Minnesota Center for Reading Research
- STEM Education Center
- University of Minnesota Child Development Center

== Publications ==
- CEHD Vision2020
- Connect alumni magazine
