= Rapson =

Rapson may refer to:

== People ==
- John Rapson (1953–2021), American jazz trombonist
- Edward James Rapson (1861–1937), numismat and historian
- Ralph Rapson (1914–2008), American architect
- Rip Rapson (born 1952), American attorney and philanthropist
- Syd Rapson (born 1942), British politician; MP from Portsmouth North 1997–2005
- William Sage Rapson (1912–1999), New Zealand and South African chemist

== Places ==
- Rapson, Michigan, an unincorporated community in the United States
