= List of lakes of Pulaski County, Arkansas =

There are at least 110 named lakes and reservoirs in Pulaski County, Arkansas.

== Lakes ==
- Big Lake, 34°33′53″N 092°12′56″W, el. 226 feet (69 m)
- Devoe Lake, 34°51′31″N 092°22′47″W, el. 249 feet (76 m)
- Ferguson Lake, 34°31′44″N 092°13′48″W, el. 226 feet (69 m)
- Georgetown Lake, 34°36′57″N 092°08′15″W, el. 220 feet (67 m)
- Ginhouse Lake, 34°39′39″N 092°07′33″W, el. 236 feet (72 m)
- Hills Lake, 34°45′57″N 092°06′44″W, el. 243 feet (74 m)
- Horseshoe Lake, 34°41′57″N 092°06′26″W, el. 233 feet (71 m)
- Lake Kuykendall, 34°35′17″N 092°11′18″W, el. 226 feet (69 m)
- McQuire Lake, 34°37′09″N 092°19′39″W, el. 331 feet (101 m)
- Old River Lake, 34°38′07″N 092°07′26″W, el. 233 feet (71 m)
- Peeler Lake, 34°49′14″N 092°12′00″W, el. 243 feet (74 m)
- Rosenbaum Lake, 34°48′34″N 092°21′58″W, el. 249 feet (76 m)
- Round Hole, 34°36′24″N 092°11′16″W, el. 230 feet (70 m)
- Sadler Pond, 34°55′53″N 092°10′24″W, el. 272 feet (83 m)
- Trammel Lake, 34°49′13″N 092°11′26″W, el. 243 feet (74 m)
- Willow Beach Lake, 34°42′29″N 092°07′45″W, el. 230 feet (70 m)

== Reservoirs ==
- Aldersgate Lake, 34°43′48″N 092°23′37″W, el. 374 feet (114 m)
- Alneta Lake, 34°47′01″N 092°32′19″W, el. 341 feet (104 m)
- Baldwin Lake, 34°49′33″N 092°33′35″W, el. 354 feet (108 m)
- Beal Lake, 34°52′28″N 092°12′39″W, el. 256 feet (78 m)
- Big Dickinson Lake, 34°42′51″N 092°19′04″W, el. 239 feet (73 m)
- Big Rock Settling Pond, 34°41′59″N 092°17′33″W, el. 246 feet (75 m)
- Bredlow Reservoir, 34°29′59″N 092°05′04″W, el. 226 feet (69 m)
- Broadmoor Lake, 34°43′36″N 092°20′41″W, el. 322 feet (98 m)
- Brown Lake, 34°54′57″N 092°12′38″W, el. 295 feet (90 m)
- Camp Grundy Lake, 34°48′55″N 092°29′56″W, el. 331 feet (101 m)
- Camp Robinson Lake Number One, 34°49′54″N 092°16′53″W, el. 472 feet (144 m)
- Camp Robinson Lake Number Two, 34°49′54″N 092°16′53″W, el. 472 feet (144 m)
- Cecil White Reservoir, 34°43′06″N 092°29′45″W, el. 469 feet (143 m)
- Cook Lake, 34°43′48″N 092°23′37″W, el. 374 feet (114 m)
- Coulter Lake, 34°37′54″N 092°22′28″W, el. 305 feet (93 m)
- Dailey Lake, 34°40′51″N 092°27′57″W, el. 377 feet (115 m)
- David D Terry Lake, 34°40′01″N 092°09′18″W, el. 233 feet (71 m)
- Davis Lake, 34°59′52″N 092°10′17″W, el. 384 feet (117 m)
- Dougan Lake, 34°48′59″N 092°31′33″W, el. 315 feet (96 m)
- Dupree Lake, 34°51′05″N 092°08′50″W, el. 239 feet (73 m)
- Eanes Minnow Farm Lake Number One, 34°43′18″N 092°06′31″W, el. 243 feet (74 m)
- Eanes Minnow Farm Lake Number Two, 34°43′26″N 092°07′04″W, el. 236 feet (72 m)
- Faulkner Lake, 34°58′13″N 092°08′51″W, el. 348 feet (106 m)
- Fletcher Lake, 34°41′22″N 092°32′53″W, el. 581 feet (177 m)
- Foreman Lake, 34°46′10″N 092°22′08″W, el. 427 feet (130 m)
- Fountain Head Lake, 34°37′48″N 092°18′34″W, el. 315 feet (96 m)
- Gardner Company Lake, 34°41′39″N 092°25′11″W, el. 341 feet (104 m)
- Ginger Hill Lake, 34°48′14″N 092°33′14″W, el. 404 feet (123 m)
- Glover Lake, 34°43′07″N 092°30′16″W, el. 466 feet (142 m)
- Gray's Lake, 34°46′15″N 092°31′48″W, el. 420 feet (130 m)
- Green Bear Lake, 34°43′45″N 092°28′59″W, el. 492 feet (150 m)
- Green Lake, 34°44′38″N 092°29′45″W, el. 577 feet (176 m)
- Gribble Lake, 34°56′04″N 092°10′29″W, el. 266 feet (81 m)
- Gropper Lake, 34°29′44″N 092°12′18″W, el. 249 feet (76 m)
- Harris Lake, 34°47′14″N 092°09′05″W, el. 239 feet (73 m)
- Hatcher Lake Number One, 34°54′37″N 092°12′07″W, el. 256 feet (78 m)
- Hatcher Lake Number Two, 34°54′29″N 092°12′06″W, el. 266 feet (81 m)
- Hudmans Lake Number One, 34°50′05″N 092°21′08″W, el. 256 feet (78 m)
- Hudmans Lake Number Two, 34°49′59″N 092°20′58″W, el. 259 feet (79 m)
- Indianhead Lake, 34°50′37″N 092°10′48″W, el. 246 feet (75 m)
- Jackson Lake, 34°59′08″N 092°09′51″W, el. 308 feet (94 m)
- Jackson Reservoir, 34°46′34″N 092°22′17″W, el. 541 feet (165 m)
- Keener Lake, 34°59′37″N 092°06′13″W, el. 348 feet (106 m)
- Kirk Lake, 34°45′56″N 092°27′08″W, el. 525 feet (160 m)
- Koban Lake, 34°42′09″N 092°25′57″W, el. 390 feet (120 m)
- L D Rogers Lake, 34°55′40″N 092°24′16″W, el. 348 feet (106 m)
- Lake Alpine, 34°43′40″N 092°27′40″W, el. 495 feet (151 m)
- Lake Bendine, 34°42′12″N 092°19′54″W, el. 256 feet (78 m)
- Lake Cherrywood, 34°49′41″N 092°12′12″W, el. 249 feet (76 m)
- Lake Florence, 34°43′08″N 092°28′24″W, el. 479 feet (146 m)
- Lake Maumelle, 34°52′43″N 092°34′00″W, el. 279 feet (85 m)
- Lake Nixon, 34°43′01″N 092°26′02″W, el. 410 feet (120 m)
- Lake Number One, 34°47′02″N 092°14′23″W, el. 289 feet (88 m)
- Lake Number Six, 34°48′09″N 092°15′02″W, el. 410 feet (120 m)
- Lake Number Three, 34°47′37″N 092°15′02″W, el. 341 feet (104 m)
- Lake Number Two, 34°47′16″N 092°14′40″W, el. 302 feet (92 m)
- Lake Patricia, 34°43′27″N 092°26′42″W, el. 482 feet (147 m)
- Lake Valencia, 34°51′45″N 092°24′12″W, el. 325 feet (99 m)
- Lakewood Lake Number One, 34°47′04″N 092°14′44″W, el. 262 feet (80 m)
- Laman Lake, 34°59′42″N 092°08′04″W, el. 404 feet (123 m)
- Landmark Lake, 34°36′17″N 092°19′22″W, el. 344 feet (105 m)
- Little Indian Lake Number One, 34°48′57″N 092°14′51″W, el. 410 feet (120 m)
- Little Indian Lake Number Two, 34°48′57″N 092°14′51″W, el. 410 feet (120 m)
- Lower Spring Lake, 34°44′30″N 092°26′13″W, el. 509 feet (155 m)
- Matthews Lake, 34°48′26″N 092°11′51″W, el. 246 feet (75 m)
- Mills Valley Lake, 34°58′39″N 092°12′16″W, el. 348 feet (106 m)
- Montgomery Lake, 34°50′09″N 092°33′18″W, el. 318 feet (97 m)
- Nixon Lake, 34°45′06″N 092°31′51″W, el. 535 feet (163 m)
- Paradise Lake, 34°53′08″N 092°08′38″W, el. 322 feet (98 m)
- Pine Crest Lake, 34°41′44″N 092°31′23″W, el. 472 feet (144 m)
- Pleasant Valley Country Club Lake, 34°46′24″N 092°24′19″W, el. 443 feet (135 m)
- Sandpiper Lake, 34°44′17″N 092°23′47″W, el. 469 feet (143 m)
- Second Edition Lake, 34°44′06″N 092°22′43″W, el. 423 feet (129 m)
- Sessions Lake, 34°57′04″N 092°10′09″W, el. 276 feet (84 m)
- Sprick Lake, 34°41′49″N 092°23′54″W, el. 322 feet (98 m)
- Spring Lake, 34°44′38″N 092°26′31″W, el. 427 feet (130 m)
- Spring Valley Lake Number One, 34°43′51″N 092°26′30″W, el. 446 feet (136 m)
- Spring Valley Lake Number Two, 34°43′43″N 092°26′14″W, el. 423 feet (129 m)
- Swan Lake, 34°46′26″N 092°29′36″W, el. 456 feet (139 m)
- Tall Pine Lake, 34°44′30″N 092°29′20″W, el. 577 feet (176 m)
- Tall Timber Lake, 34°41′57″N 092°22′57″W, el. 299 feet (91 m)
- Thomas Lake, 34°53′40″N 092°09′51″W, el. 348 feet (106 m)
- Todd Lake, 34°52′40″N 092°12′23″W, el. 262 feet (80 m)
- Transvaal Lake, 34°52′41″N 092°08′01″W, el. 279 feet (85 m)
- Twin Lakes, 34°44′27″N 092°22′49″W, el. 440 feet (130 m)
- Waldron Lake, 34°32′19″N 092°13′31″W, el. 243 feet (74 m)
- Walton Lake, 34°35′53″N 092°13′31″W, el. 239 feet (73 m)
- Ward Lake, 34°43′23″N 092°25′10″W, el. 430 feet (130 m)
- Western Hills Lake, 34°42′16″N 092°21′28″W, el. 282 feet (86 m)
- Wilkins Lake, 34°59′34″N 092°08′04″W, el. 384 feet (117 m)
- Willastein Lake, 34°51′02″N 092°24′42″W, el. 279 feet (85 m)
- Willow Beach Lake, 34°42′12″N 092°08′01″W, el. 236 feet (72 m)
- Wilson Lake, 34°43′51″N 092°25′34″W, el. 371 feet (113 m)
- Wingate Lake, 34°45′13″N 092°21′36″W, el. 384 feet (117 m)

== See also ==
- List of lakes in Arkansas
