= Ralph Rapson =

American architect (1914–2008)

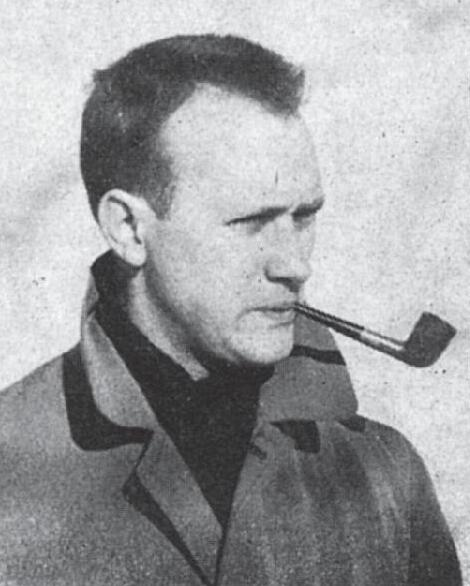
- Rapson c. 1945
- Born: September 13, 1914; Alma, Michigan, United States
- Died: March 29, 2008 (aged 93); Minneapolis, Minnesota, United States
- Education: University of Michigan
- Occupation: Architect
- Practice: Ralph Rapson and Associates
- Buildings: Guthrie Theater (demolished), Riverside Plaza (Cedar Square West), University of Minnesota Rarig Center, churches, residences and U.S. embassies
- Projects: Knoll furniture, Case Study House

Ralph Rapson (September 13, 1914 – March 29, 2008) was Head of the School of Architecture at the University of Minnesota for 30 years. He was an interdisciplinary designer, one of the world's oldest practicing architects at his death at age 93, and also one of the most prolific. His oldest son is the philanthropist Rip Rapson.

== Early life and education ==
Rapson was born in Alma, Michigan with a deformed right arm that was amputated at birth; he learned to draw expertly with his left hand. He earned architecture degrees at the University of Michigan, and at the Cranbrook Academy of Art, where he studied under Eliel Saarinen. “Cranbrook was a very exciting, dynamic place where I met and worked with guys like Charlie Eames, Harry Bertoia, and Harry Weese,” Rapson said.

As a young architect, Rapson worked for the Saarinen architectural office from 1940 to 1941. He moved to Chicago in 1941, where he worked with George Fred Keck and others.

== Teaching ==
Rapson taught architecture at the New Bauhaus School (now IIT Institute of Design) in Chicago under Laszlo Maholy-Nagy from 1942 to 1946, and at the Massachusetts Institute of Technology from 1946 to 1954.

He was Head of the School of Architecture at the University of Minnesota from 1954 to 1984, where "generations of Minnesota architects came up through [his] tutelage".

== Architectural practice and philosophy ==
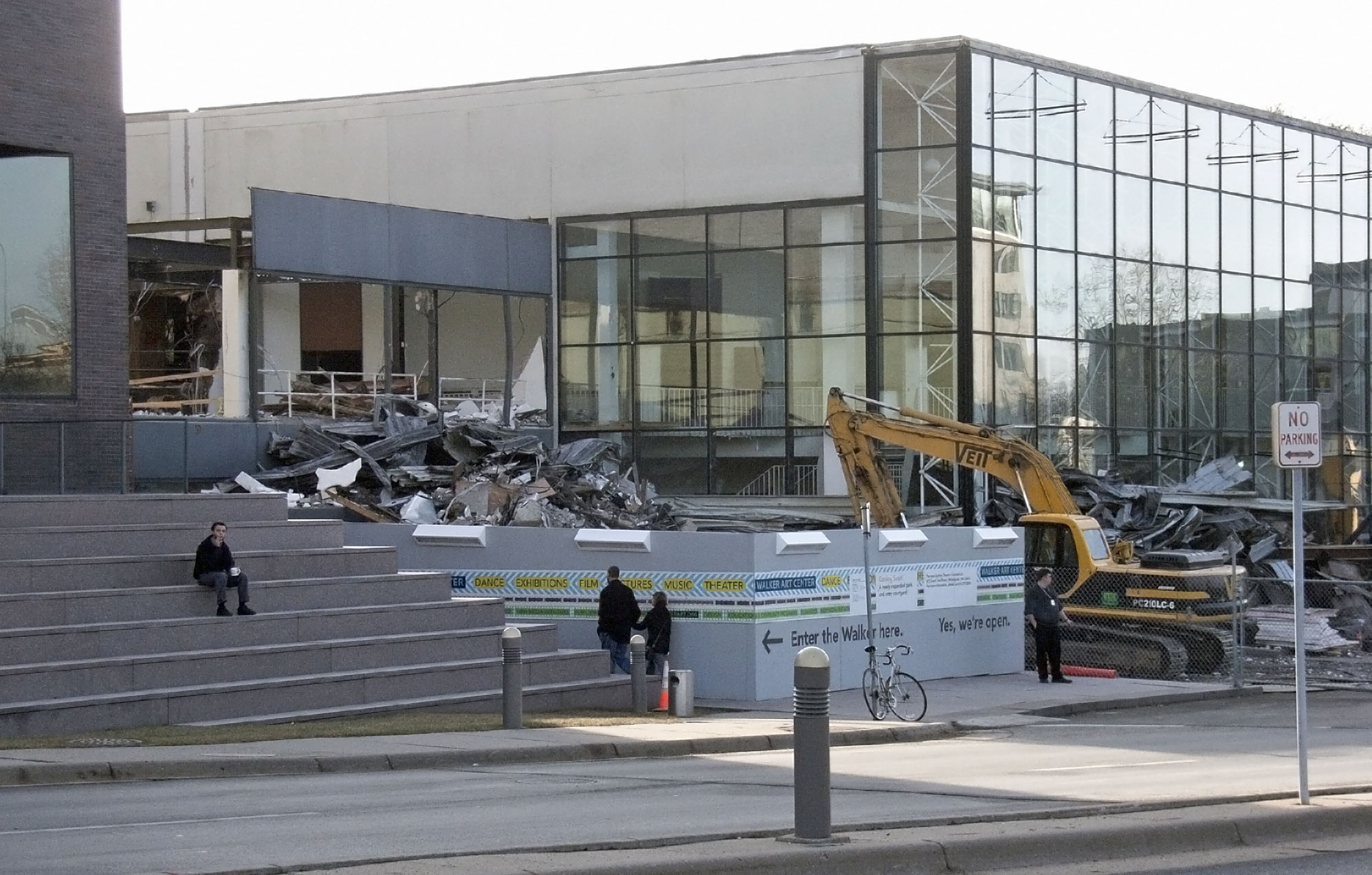
The first Guthrie Theater (1963) during demolition (2006)

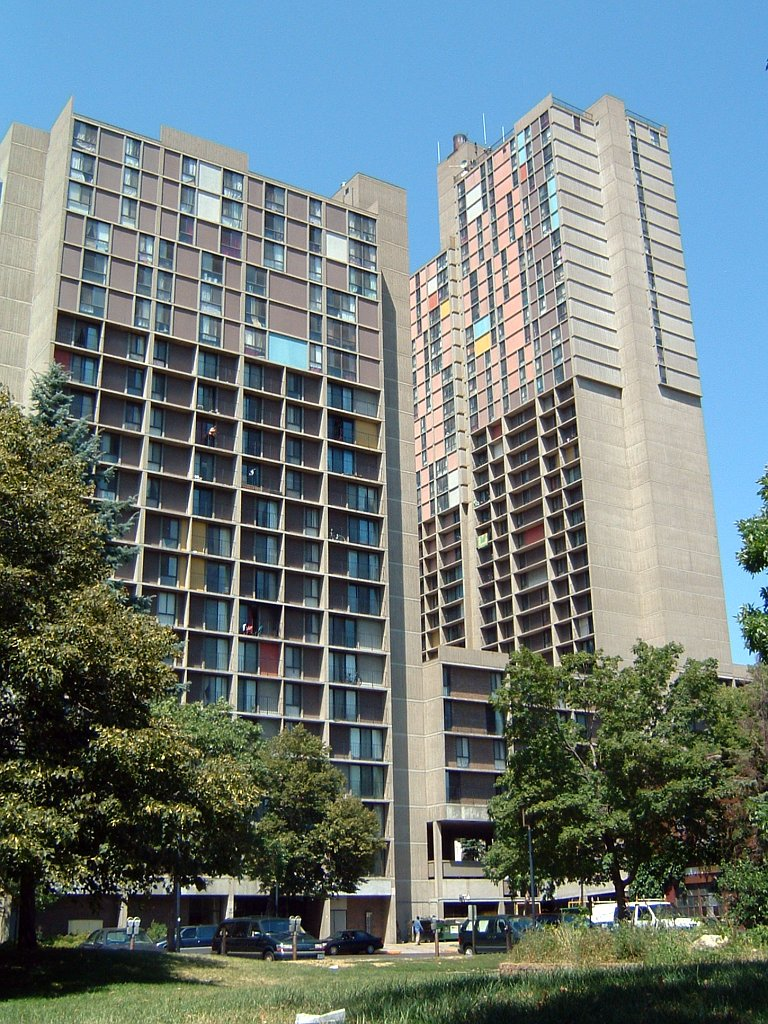
Riverside Plaza, formerly Cedar Square West (1973)

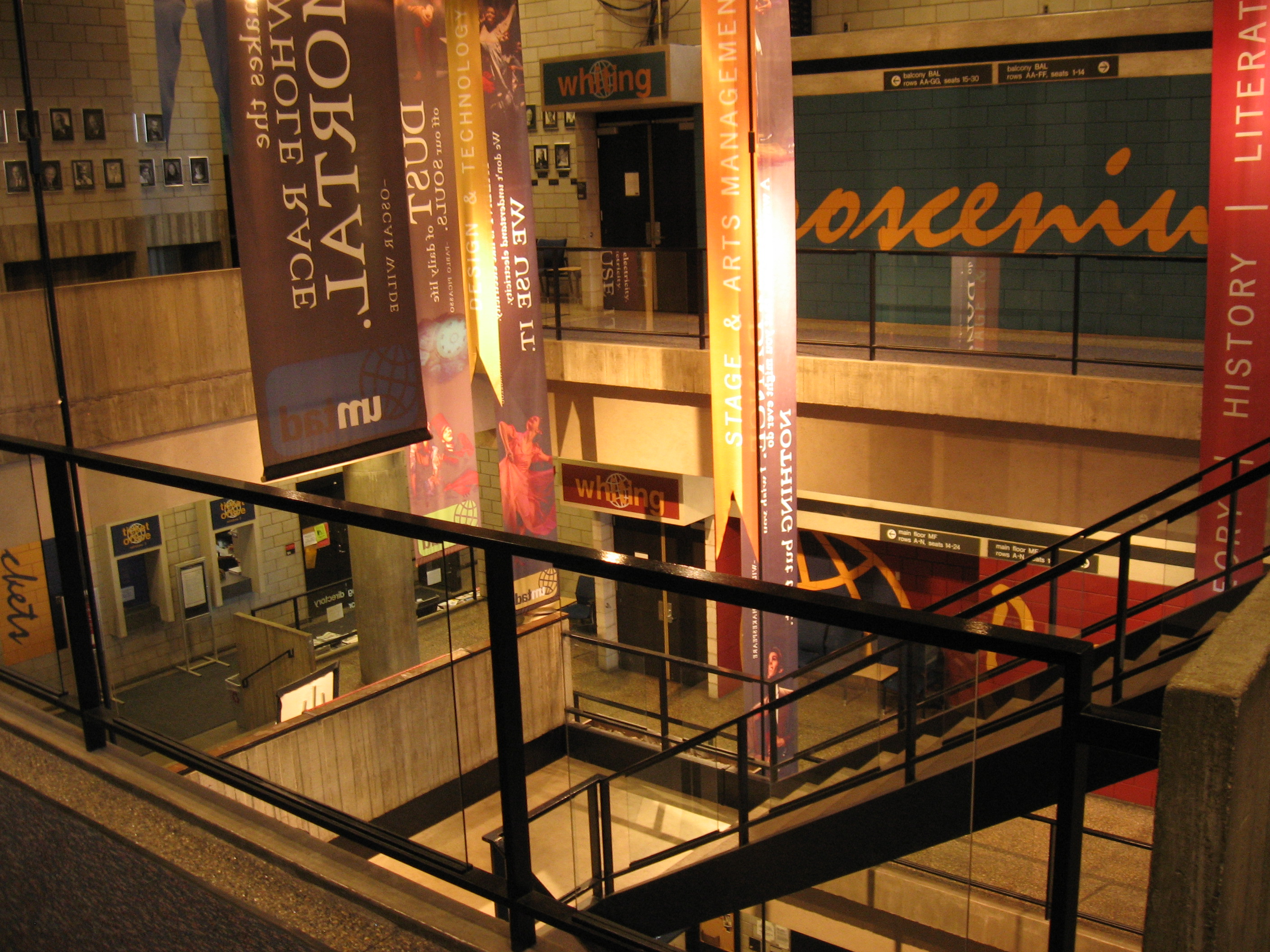
Rarig Center (1973), University of Minnesota

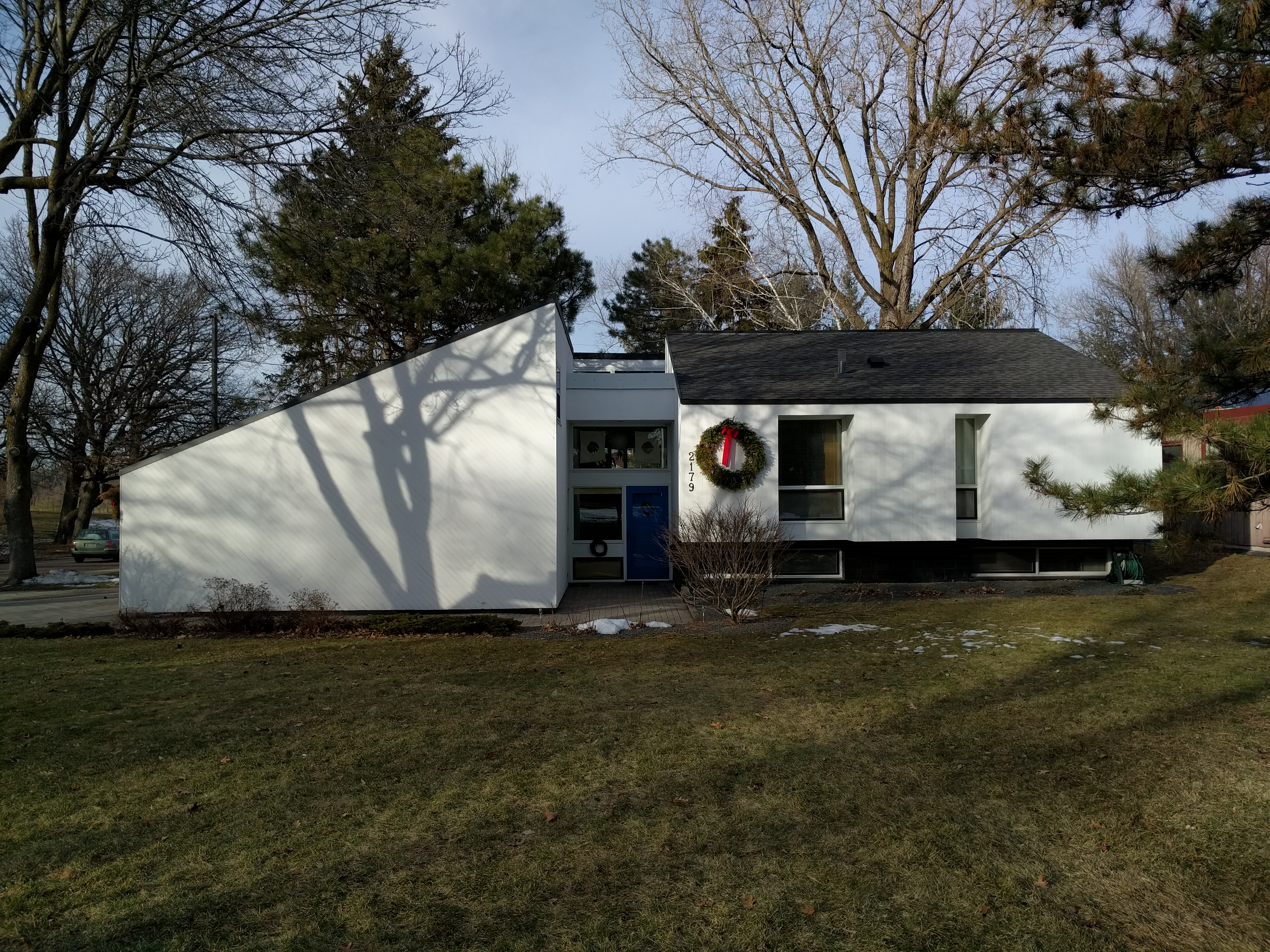
Joseph Livermore House (1968) in University Grove

While at Cranbrook, Rapson was part of a team with Eero Saarinen and Fred James which won the competition for a National Festival Theater on the campus of the College of William and Mary. This would possibly have been the first Modernist building on an American academic campus, but it went unbuilt amidst political opposition to the sponsoring organization, the American National Theater and Academy, spurred by the controversial productions of the independent but similar Federal Theater Project (also shuttered in 1939).

After accepting his position at the University of Minnesota, Rapson led his own practice in Minneapolis from 1954 to 2008. His work was predominantly in the Modernist style and greatly influenced by his time at the New Bauhaus School. “Practically all the work I’ve done is not too far off from Bauhaus principles,” he said. However, he also stressed his work was oriented to people rather than abstract principles: “Whenever I’m designing a building or a piece of furniture, people become a strong part of my general approach. The design process isn’t just about bricks and stones; for me it’s also about the people in a building and how I expect them to live.”

Rapson was a prolific sketch artist and kept volumes of sketchbooks from his various world travels. A book of selected sketches was published in 2002. In the book's introduction, Cesar Pelli described his drawings as "completely self-assured" and "quintessentially American."

== Buildings and projects ==
Some of Rapson's most important projects include:

- 1945: Case Study House No. 4, or "Greenbelt House" (part of the Case Study House program)
  - Esther McCoy famously wrote: "Rapson’s rendering of the house showed a helicopter hovering over the flat roof, as if the owner was coming home to the suburbs from his day at the office. His wife is waving to him. Where is she? Hanging out diapers in the drying yard. Rapson’s money was on the wrong machine."
  - The "Greenbelt House" was constructed in 1989 for an exhibit at the Museum of Contemporary Art in Los Angeles.
  - In recent years Rapson's firm developed a line of prefabricated modern houses called the Rapson Greenbelt, which grew out of a submission for the Dwell Home Design Invitational and are now available through a company called Wieler.
- 1945: "Rapson Rapid Rocker" for Knoll Furniture
- 1954: United States Embassy, Diplomatstaden, Stockholm, Sweden
- 1954: United States Embassy, Copenhagen, Denmark
- 1957: St. Peter's Lutheran Church, Edina, Minnesota
- 1959: Prince of Peace Lutheran Church for the Deaf, St. Paul, Minnesota (demolished 2007)
- 1962-73: Cedar Square West (now Riverside Plaza) housing complex, Minneapolis, Minnesota (a federally funded New-Town-in-Town)
- 1963: Pillsbury House in Wayzata, Minnesota (demolished 1997)
- 1963: Guthrie Theater, Minneapolis, Minnesota (demolished 2006)
- 1964: State Capital Credit Union, Minneapolis, Minnesota (converted to Southeast Library in 1967)
- 1969: St. Thomas Aquinas Catholic Church, St. Paul Park, Minnesota
- 1972: Rarig Center, Minneapolis, Minnesota

== Awards and honors ==
- American Institute of Architects College of Fellows (FAIA)
- Gold Medal, Minnesota Society of Architects
- Association of Collegiate Schools of Architecture (ACSA) Distinguished Professor Award, 1984-85.
- AIA/ACSA Topaz Medallion, 1987
- Winner, Dwell magazine lounge chair design competition, 2007
- Neutra Medal for Professional Excellence: In recognition for his contributions to the Environmental Design Profession and in honor of Modernist architect Richard Neutra, 1984.

== Death and remembrances ==
Rapson died quietly in his home in Minneapolis on March 29, 2008. He was working in his office the previous day. Six hundred people attended his memorial service at the new Guthrie Theater. He was described as a "rock star" in the field.

Thomas Fisher, Dean of the University of Minnesota's College of Design at the time (and Dean of the School of Architecture until the College's establishment ), said: “His passing ends an era in American architecture as well as in the history of the school, and he will be very much missed by the thousands of people he influenced.” Linda Mack remembered him as "A gentleman of the old school [who] maintained his career, his dignity, his charm and his kindliness to the end. He left more than an architectural legacy." According to Kay Lockhart, "Ralph loved being an architect, and he told me once, he 'felt sorry for anyone who wasn't an architect.' He infused us all with that same spirit." His was survived by his wife Mary and two sons, Richard "Rip" and Thomas "Toby", and a daughter, Ren, from a previous marriage.
