= Elizabeth Close =

Austrian-American architect

- Elizabeth Close and her husband Winston reviewing an architectural model (c. 1955)
- Born: Elizabeth Scheu; June 4, 1912; Vienna, Austria
- Died: November 29, 2011 (aged 99); Minneapolis, Minnesota, U.S.
- Education: Technische Hochschule; MIT
- Occupation: Architect
- Spouse: Winston Close
- Children: Three children
- Parent(s): Gustav Scheu and Helene Scheu née Riesz
- Awards: Minnesota Gold Medal (AIA), 2002
- Practice: Close and Scheu Architects, Close Associates
- Buildings: Ferguson Hall at University of Minnesota

Elizabeth "Lisl" Close, (née Scheu; 4 June 1912, in Vienna – 29 November 2011, in Minneapolis) was an influential female architect practicing in Minnesota. During her long partnership with her husband, Winston "Win" Close (1906-1997), she designed many notable public buildings and private homes while managing the family firm for extended periods.

== Early life ==
Born in 1912 in Vienna, Austria, to Gustav Scheu and Helene Scheu née Riesz, Elizabeth Scheu grew up in a house designed by Adolf Loos in 1913, an early practitioner of modern architecture. Artists were frequent guests in the home, including Ezra Pound and John Gunther. She became interested in architecture, in which she graduated at the Technische Hochschule in Vienna. Perhaps because she had a Jewish mother, she left Austria in August 1932—before the arrival of the Nazis—sailing aboard the SS American Merchant from London, and arrived in New York on 29 August 1932. She completed her education in Boston with an M.A. in architecture at MIT in 1935.

== Career and marriage ==
While she was studying in Boston, Close met her future husband, Winston Close, who was also a graduate student. It was not easy for women to enter the architecture profession at the time; after being rejected by two firms, she accepted an appointment by the third and started work in Philadelphia, working under architect Oscar Stonorov. In 1936, she joined the firm in Minneapolis where Winston was employed, Magney and Tusler. They established their own firm, Close and Scheu Architects, in 1938, building flat-roofed, streamlined homes.

Winston and Elizabeth Close married in 1938, at which time her professional status was so unusual that the local paper ran an article titled "Architect Weds Architect." Elizabeth kept her maiden name until she became pregnant in 1940, when convention required her to adopt her husband's name. Elizabeth ran the family firm while her husband was away during World War II and from 1950 to 1971 when he was head architect to the University of Minnesota. Architectural historian Jane King Hession says of Close: "By her example she inspired many women in architecture, myself included, but she didn't want to be known as a woman architect -- just as an architect who happened to be a woman." Close was known for designing buildings that have flat roofs, unpainted redwood or cedar siding, and large windows. They designed fourteen houses in the University Grove neighborhood owned by the University of Minnesota for its professors and staff, including their own home.

In 2002, Close was awarded the Minnesota Gold Medal, a lifetime achievement award by the American Institute of Architects (AIA); this is the highest honor given to an individual by the local branch.

== Death and legacy ==
Elizabeth Close died on 29 November 2011 at Minneapolis, Minnesota. She was a role model for a generation of women wishing to practice architecture in a male-dominated profession.

In 2020, the University of Minnesota Press published the biography Elizabeth Scheu Close: A Life in Modern Architecture. An accompanying exhibit was on display at the University of Minnesota until the campus was closed during the COVID-19 pandemic.

== Selected works ==
- 1938 – Ray Faulkner House ("The Art Today House"), plus 1940 addition – Minneapolis
- 1942 – Starke R. Hathaway House – Minneapolis
- 1948 – John & Dorothy Rood House – Minneapolis
- 1950 – Harold Whiting House – Owatonna
- 1951 – Harold & Marie Deutsch House – Minneapolis
- 1951 – William & Patricia King House – Minneapolis
- 1953 – Elizabeth and Winston Close House – University Grove
- 1953 – Close Associates offices (add'n 1970) – Minneapolis
- 1957 – "Thunderhead" cabin – Cook County
- 1958 – Duff House (demolished) – Woodland
- 1960 – Dr. Gove & Elsie Hambidge Residence – Roseville
- 1964 – Hendrik and Marri Oskam House (listed on the National Register of Historic Places) – Edina
- 1974 – Freshwater Biological Institute – Orono
- 1985 – Ferguson Hall, University of Minnesota – Minneapolis
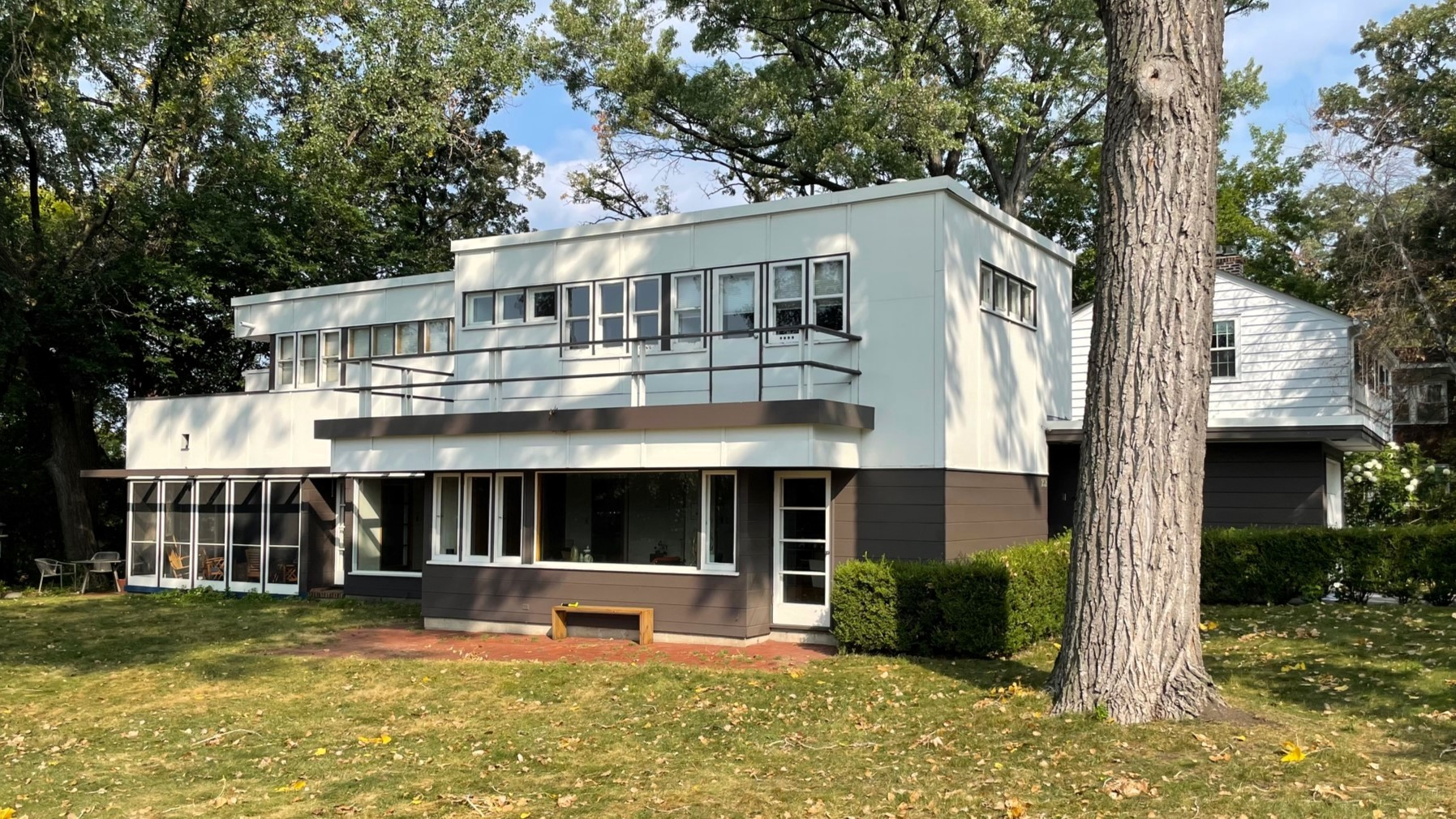
Close & Scheu's Ray Faulkner House (1938), Minneapolis, one of the first International Style houses in Minnesota and considered one of her most important works.

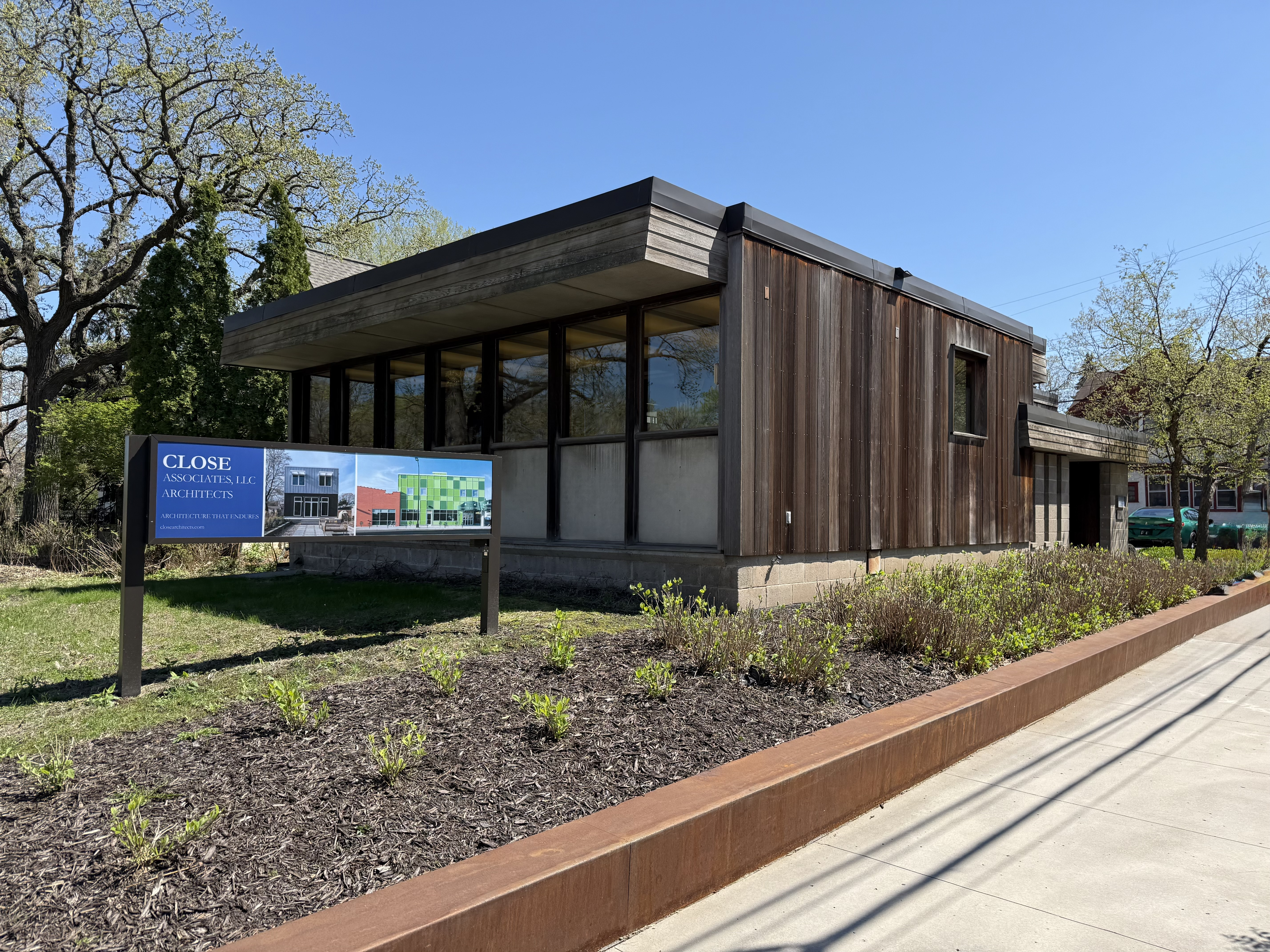
Close Associates office (1953), Minneapolis, is a crisp expression of their approach to modernism.

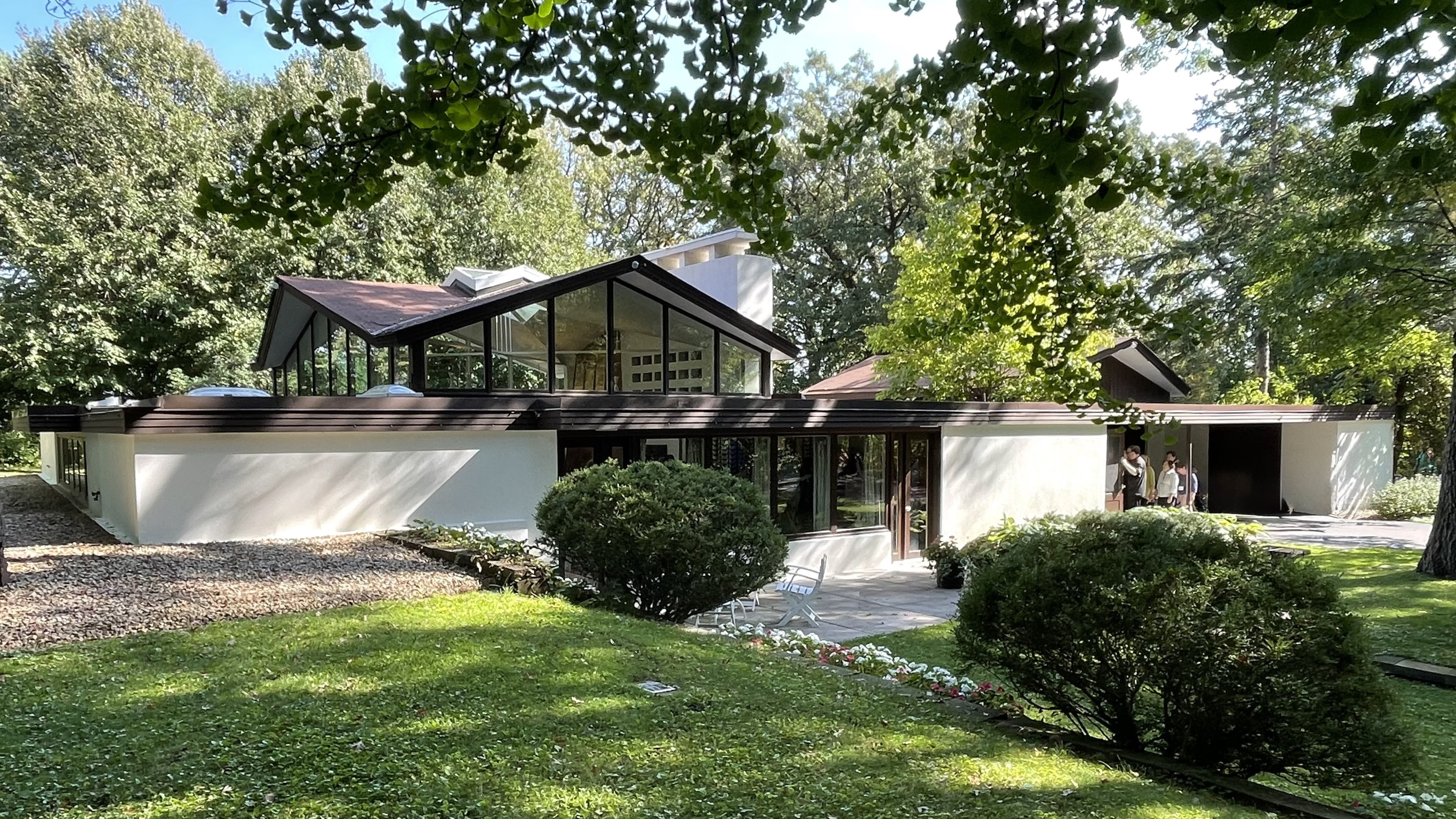
Dr. Gove & Elsie Hambidge Residence (1960), Roseville

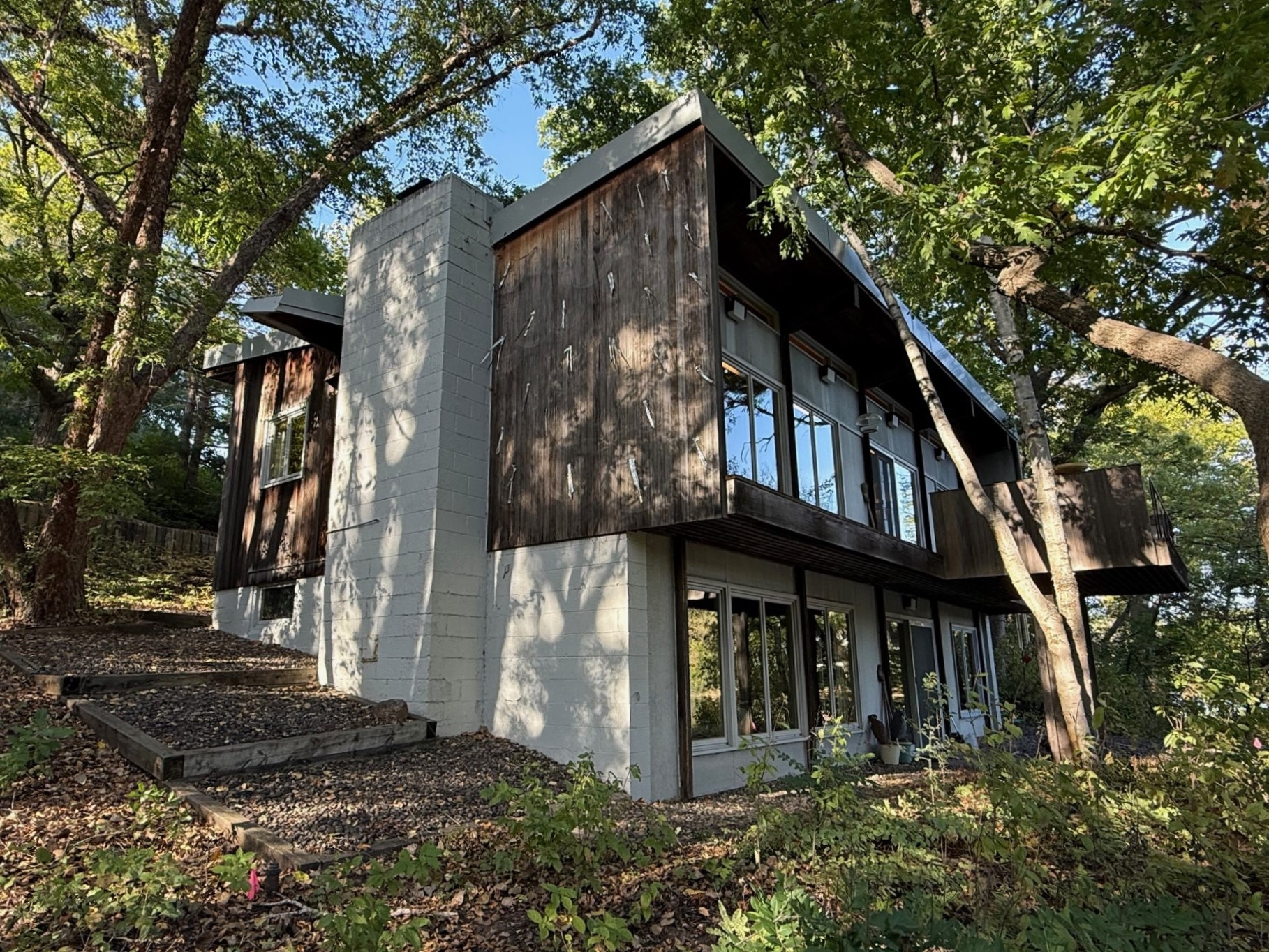
Hendrik and Marri Oskam House (1964) (NRHP), Edina

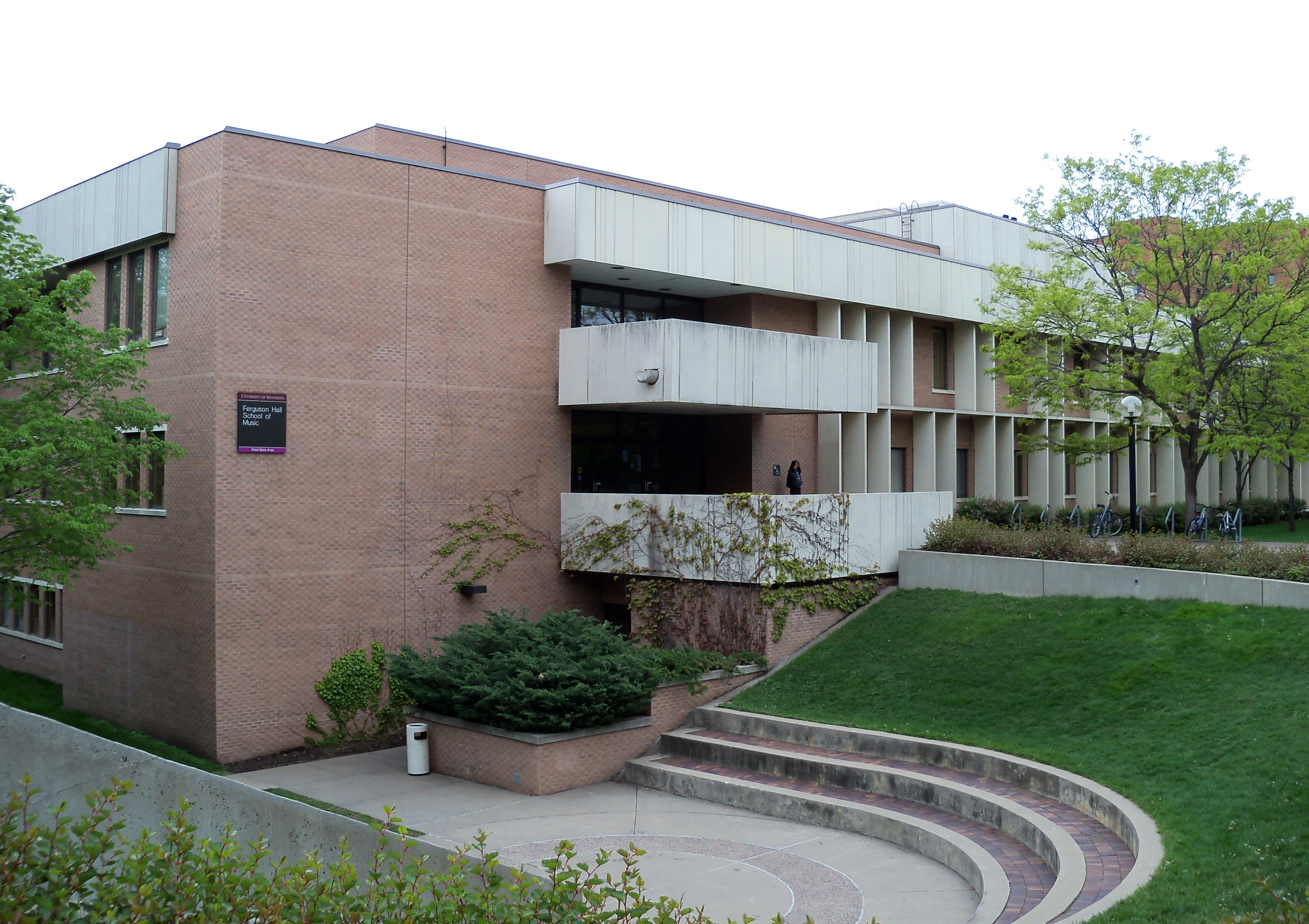
Ferguson Hall (1985), on the University of Minnesota's West Bank campus
