= Rarig Center =

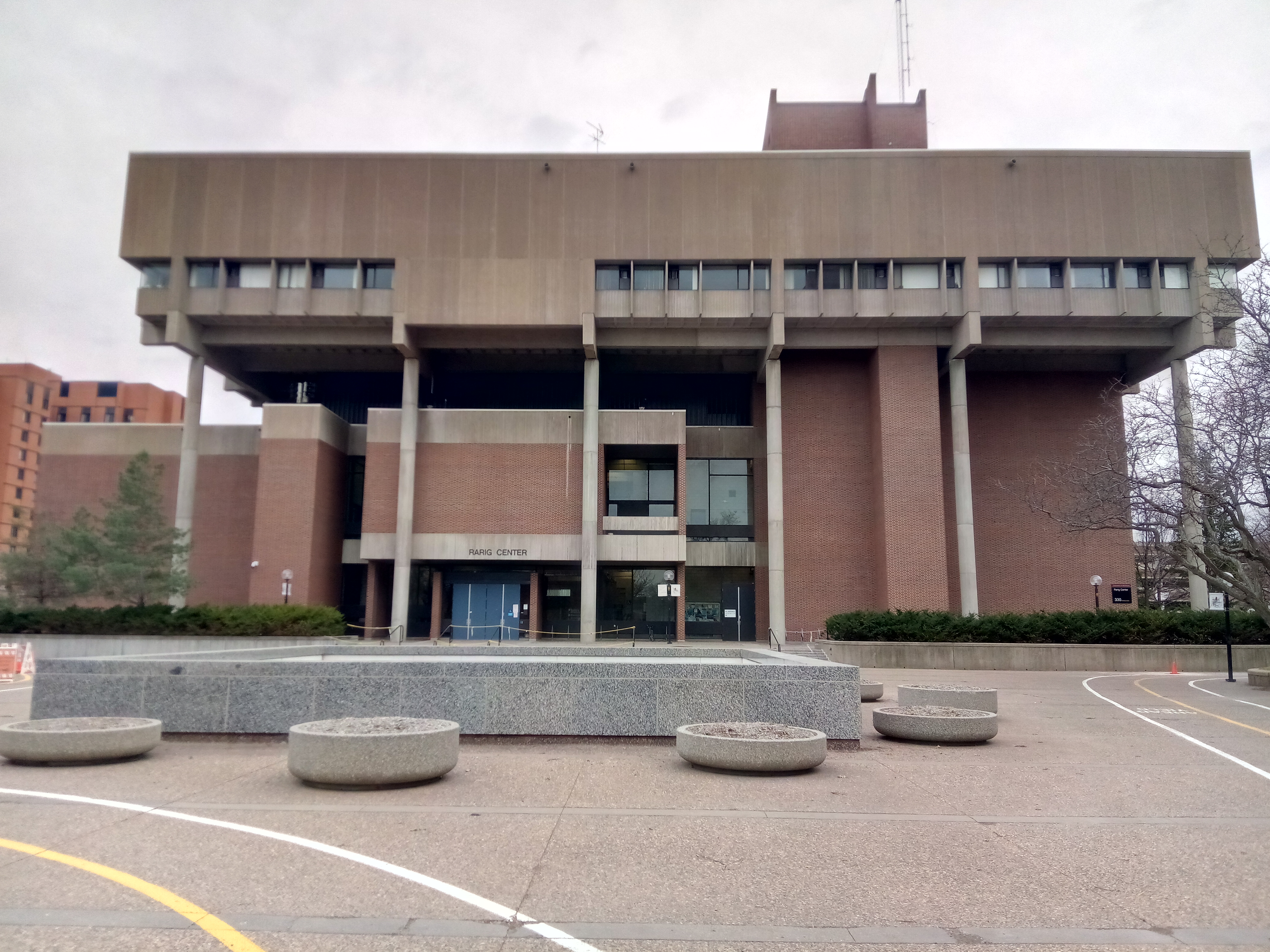
- The Rarig Center in 2021 as seen from the north
- Interactive map of the Rarig Center area

General information
- Type: Theater
- Architectural style: Brutalism
- Location: 330 21st Avenue South, Minneapolis, Minnesota 55455
- Coordinates: 44.9704083°N 93.2423223°W
- Named for: Frank Rarig
- Completed: 1971
- Owner: University of Minnesota

Design and construction
- Architect: Ralph Rapson and Associates

Website
- Official website

The Rarig Center is a brutalist theater, television, radio, and classroom building on the University of Minnesota's campus in the West Bank neighborhood of Minneapolis, Minnesota, US. Designed by Ralph Rapson and built in 1971, the structure houses four theaters—a thrust, proscenium, theater in the round, and black box—as well as the studios for Radio K. An anchor for the University's West Bank Arts Quarter, the Rarig has been praised for its boldness and functionality but has also been described as "menacing".

== Design ==
The Rarig Center was designed and built in 1971 by American architectural firm Ralph Rapson and Associates. Erected in the West Bank neighborhood of Minneapolis on the campus of the University of Minnesota, Rarig was constructed to house theaters and television studios. It sits due west of Ferguson Hall (1985), across 4th Street South to the north of the Regis Center for Art (2003), and directly southeast of Wilson Library (1967). It is the oldest of the five buildings to make up the University's West Bank Arts Quarter. The structure was named in honor of University of Minnesota speech professor Frank Rarig and dedicated on June 1, 1973.

Rapson's design for the Center borrowed imagery from Swiss-French designer Le Corbusier's New Brutalism movement. In a contemporary review of the structure, author Larry Millett noted that the Rarig is the "strongest architectural statement on the West Bank campus." Upon venturing inside, he wrote, "you half expect to find the leaders of the Evil Empire gathered somewhere in the three-story-high atrium, plotting the demise of Luke Skywalker." Authors David Gebhard and Tom Martison indicated that, like other Rapson-designed theaters, the Rarig's were quite functional and described the building as a "theatrical piece of sculpture". Millett wrote that the building's interior rooms—the offices, the radio and television studios, and the theaters—are all apparent in the building's external features.

== Facilities ==
=== Theaters ===
The Rarig houses four theaters and hosts two troupes: the University Theatre and the Xperimental Theater. The largest space is the Stoll Thrust Theatre, a 460-seat thrust stage designed as a quarter-scale replica of the original Guthrie Theater, which Rapson also designed. The Thrust features a steeply overhanging balcony, described as an "Alpine Slope". The next largest theater is the Whiting Proscenium Theatre, also called the Pro, a 420-seat proscenium stage well suited to productions with large casts and dance performances. The Kilburn Arena Theatre, a 200-seat theater in the round, includes a sprung floor over the original wood flooring. The Nolte Xperimental Theatre, also known as the X, is a black box theater with a capacity of up to 99 audience members and is configurable in a variety of ways. Productions in the X are produced only by undergraduates.

=== Other ===
The studios of Radio K (KUOM), the University of Minnesota's radio station, are housed in the Rarig Center. A variety of classrooms and theater laboratories also exist within the building, including a design studio and costume, scenery, and lighting shops.

== Gallery ==
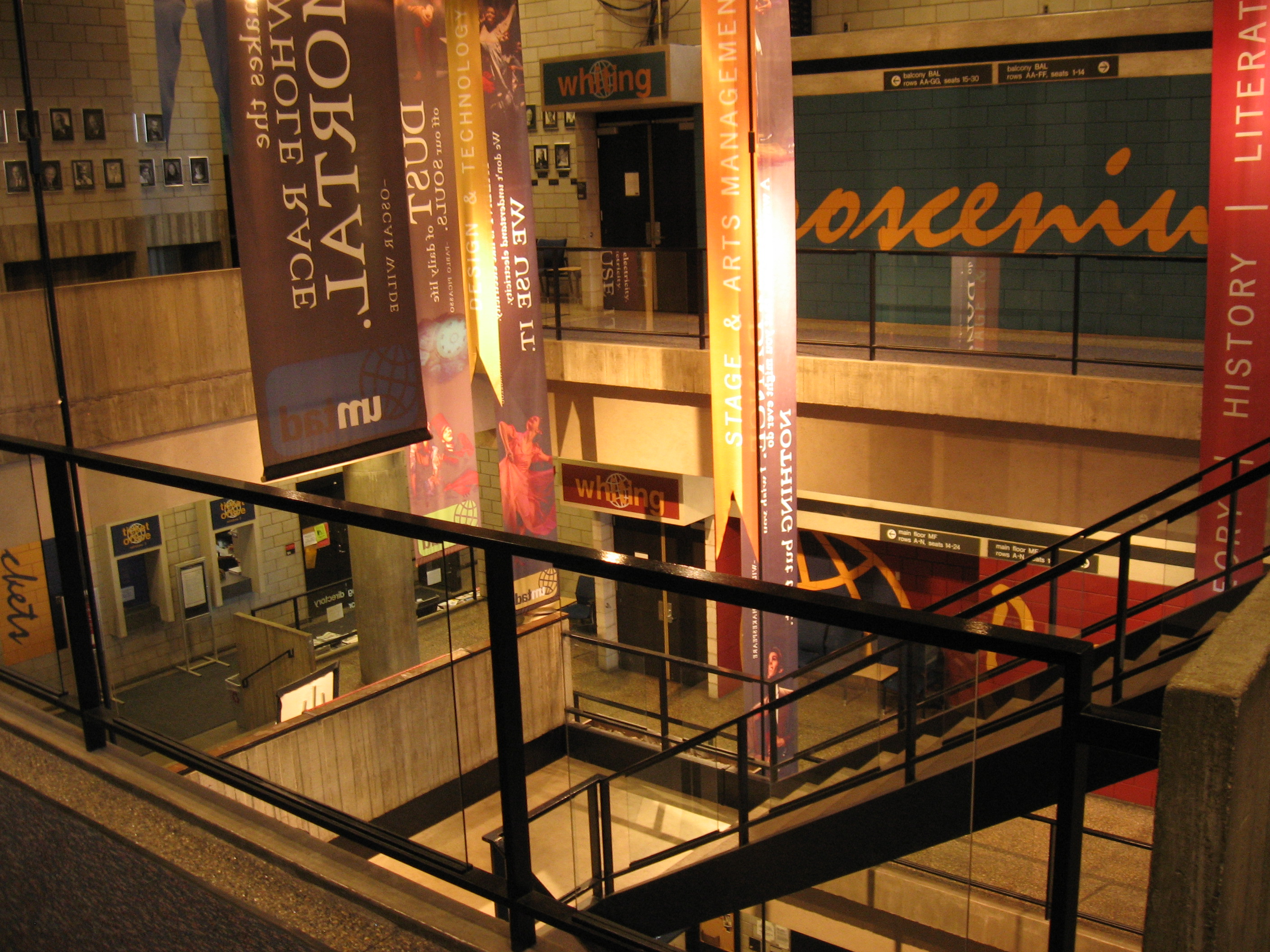
Rarig's interior atrium in 2007

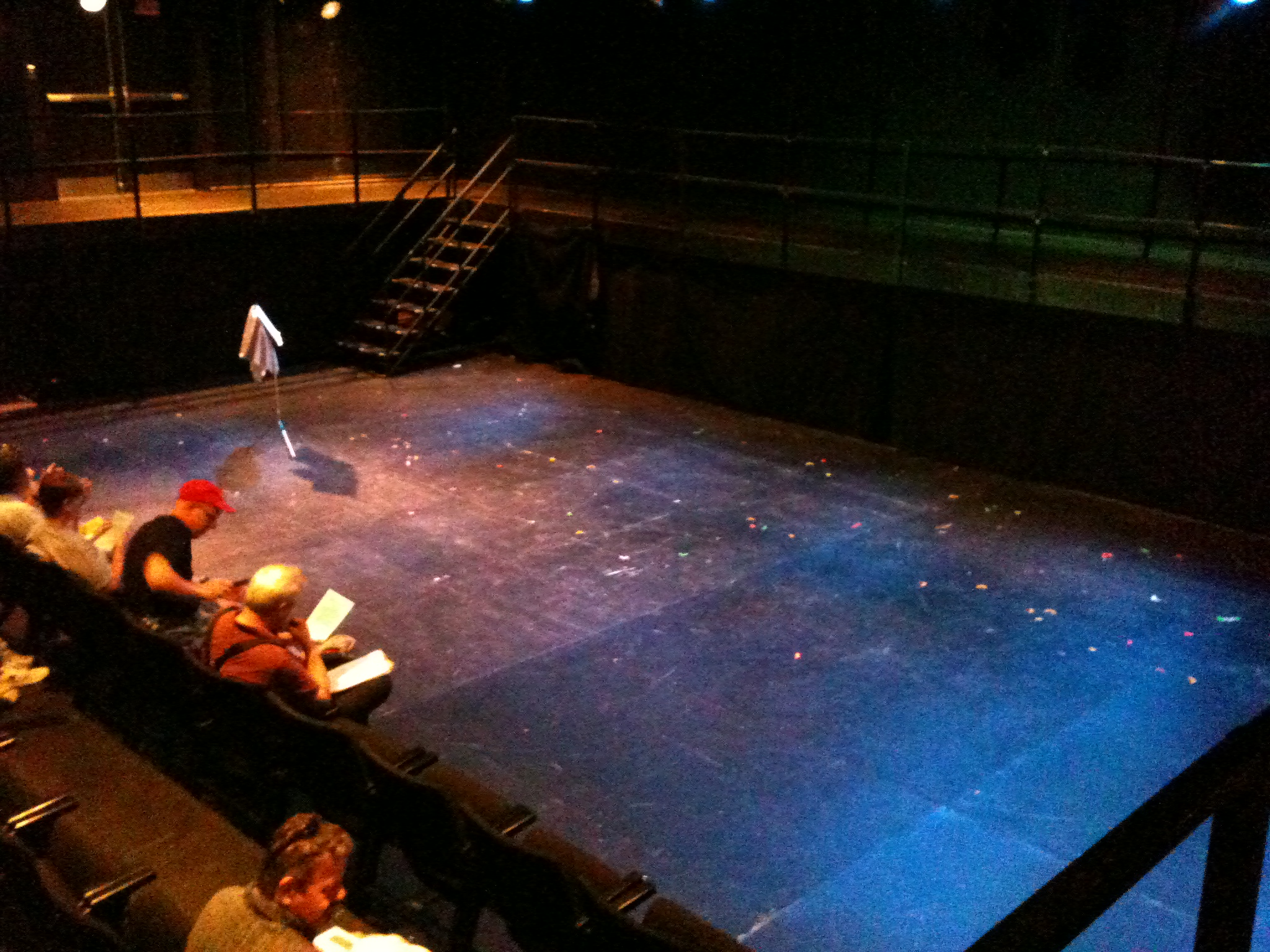
The Nolte Xperimental Theatre during the 2010 Minnesota Fringe Festival

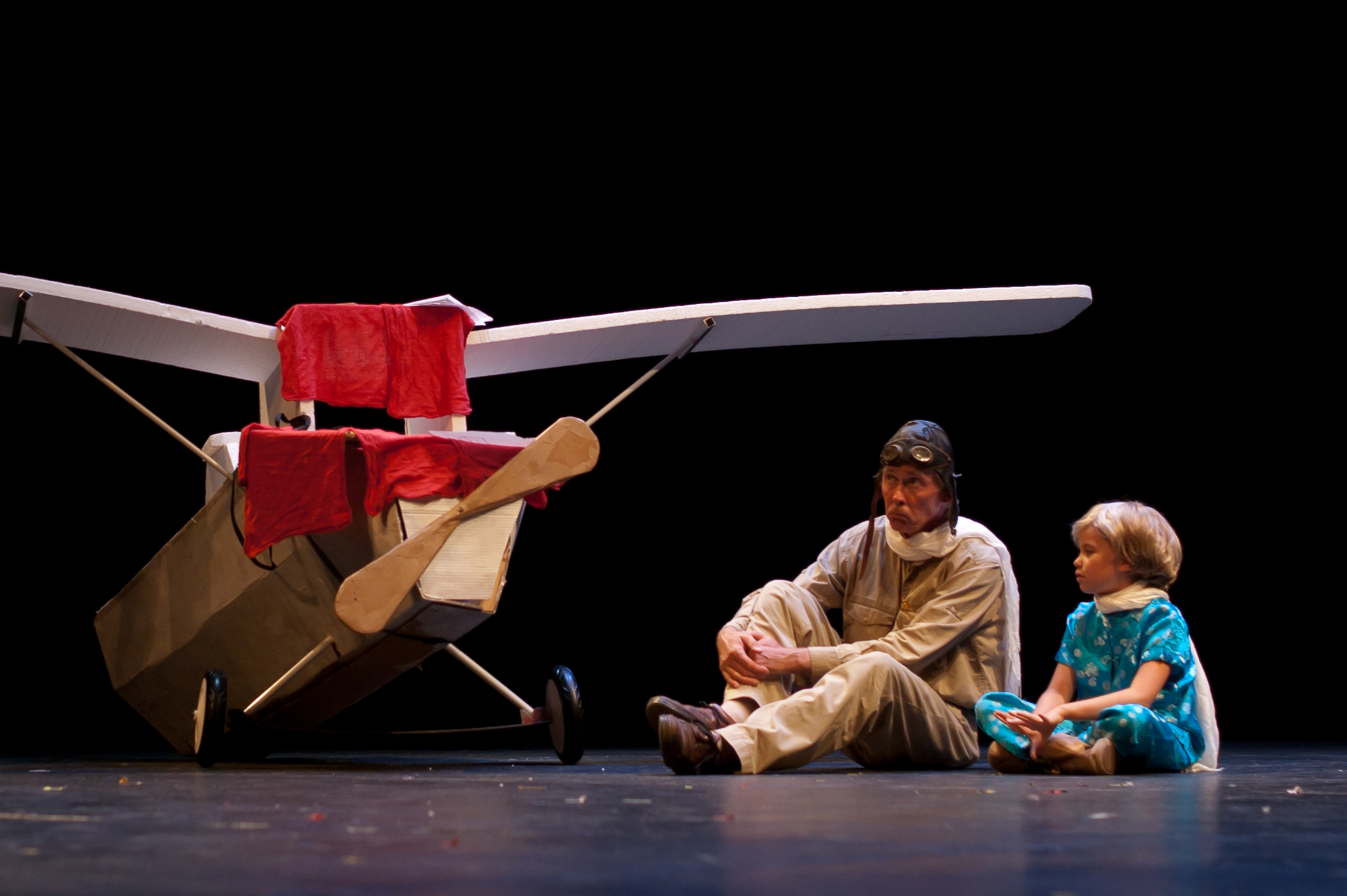
A stage adaptation of The Little Prince in the Rarig Center's Proscenium, in 2010
