= University Grove, Minnesota =

Coordinates: 44.9891°N 93.1930°W

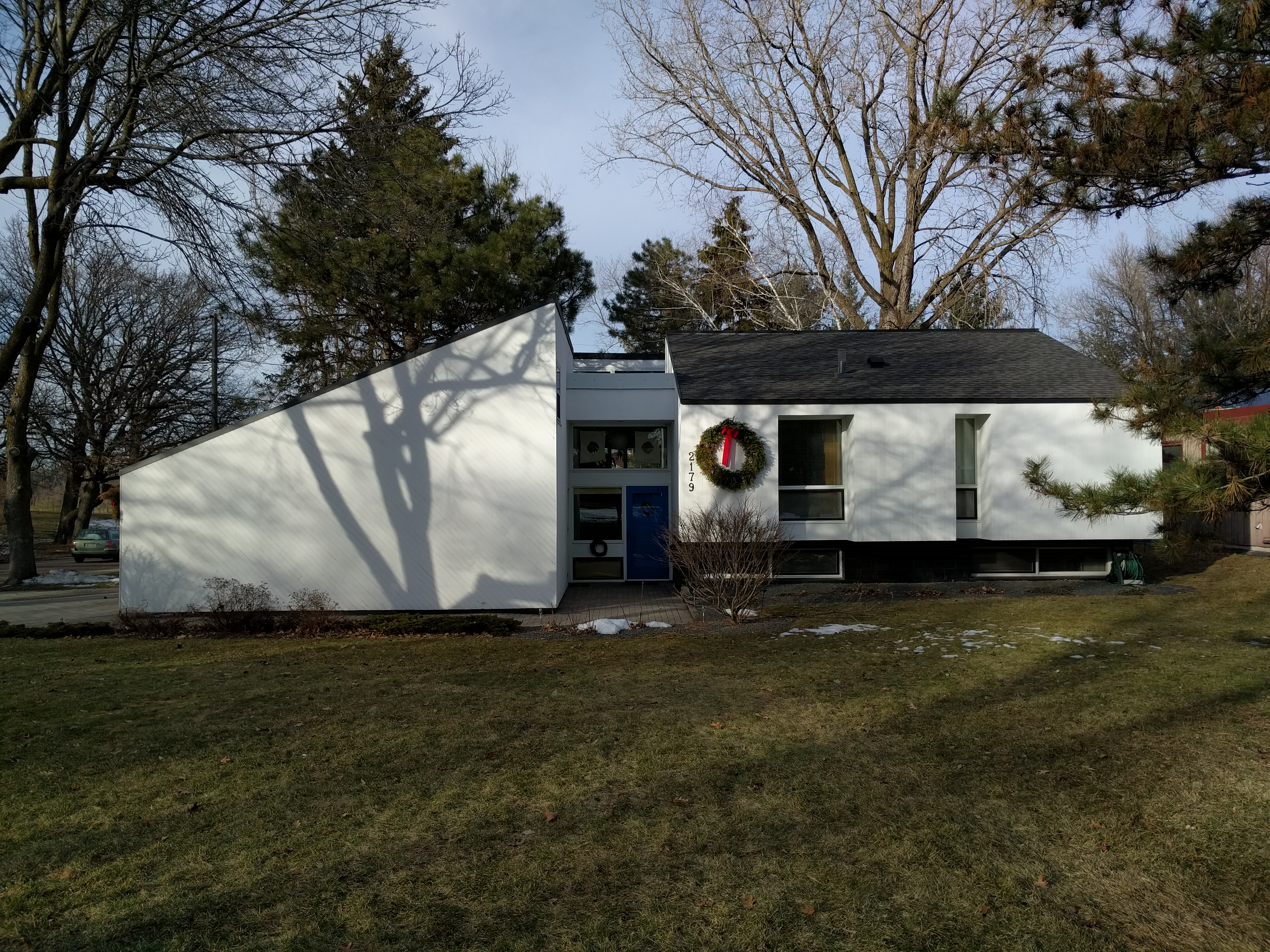
Joseph Livermore House (1968) by Ralph Rapson

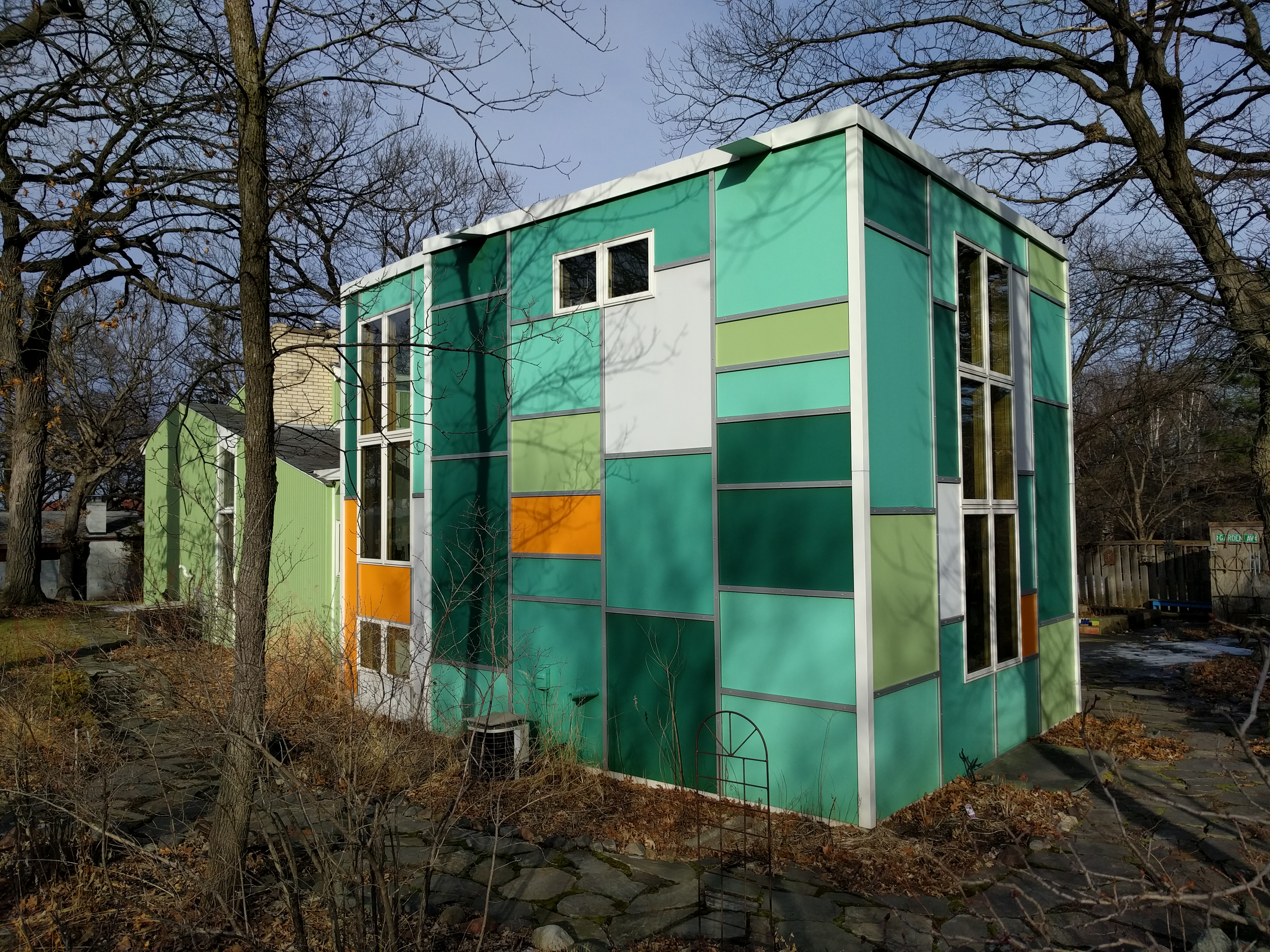

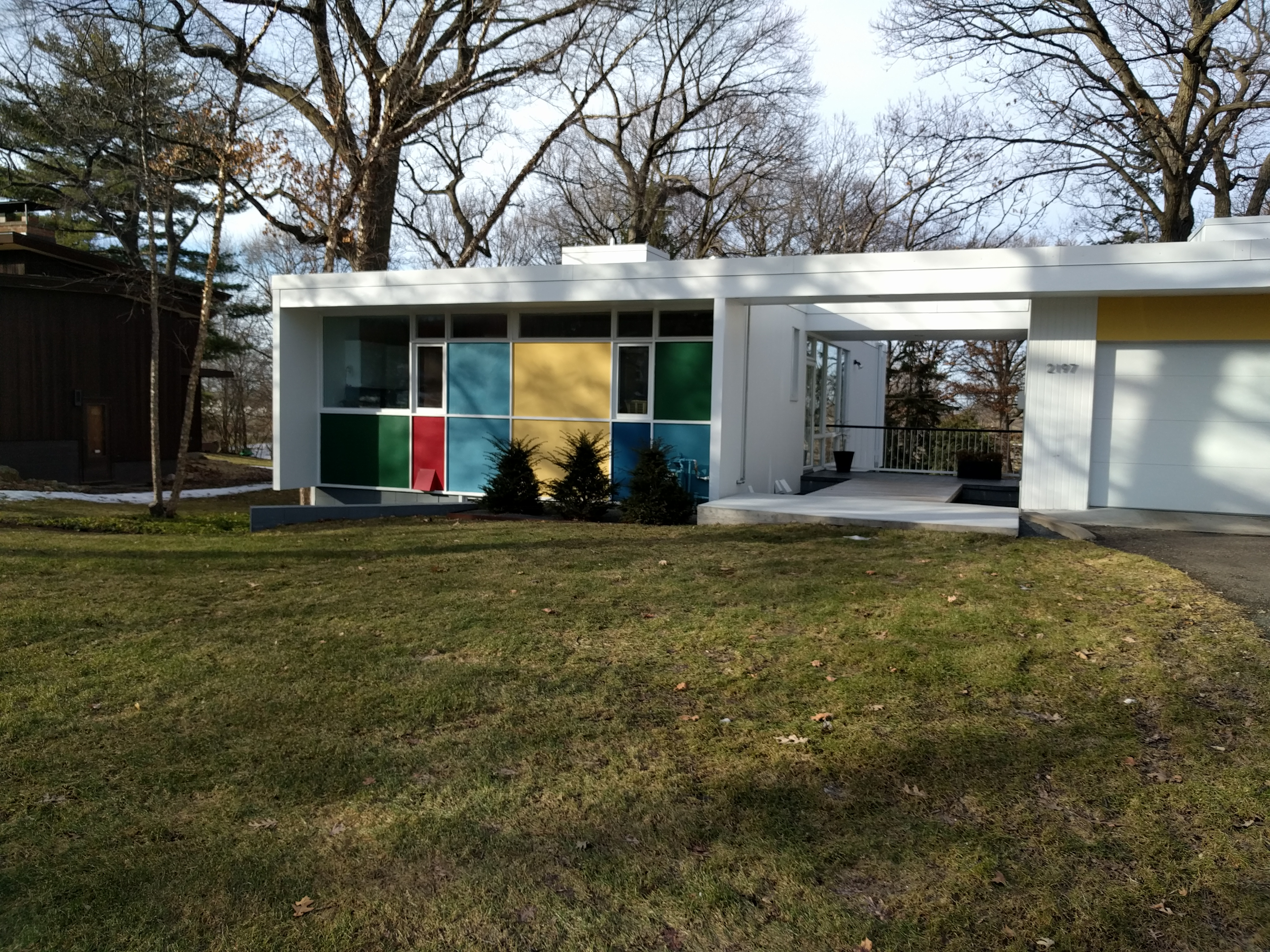

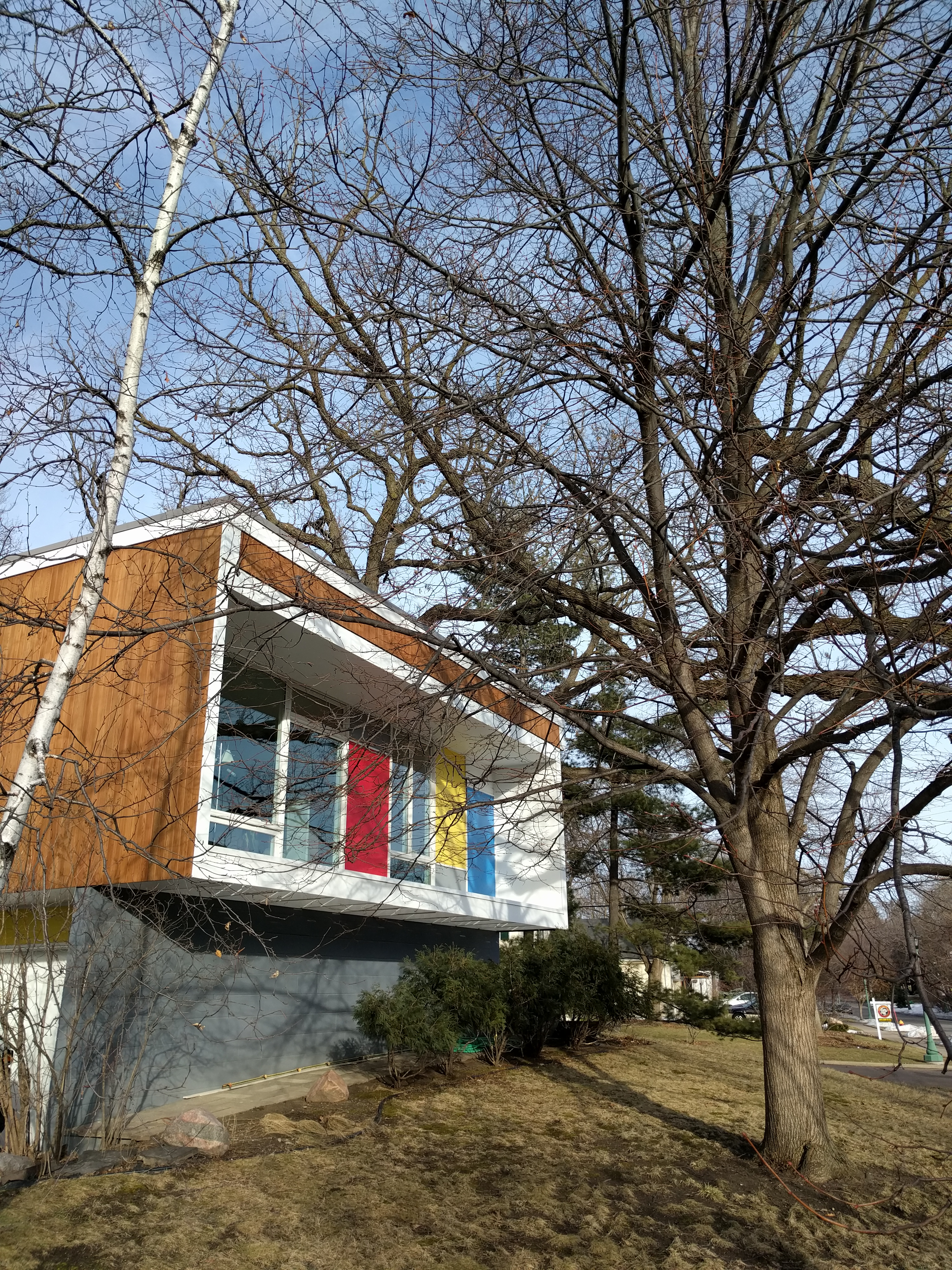

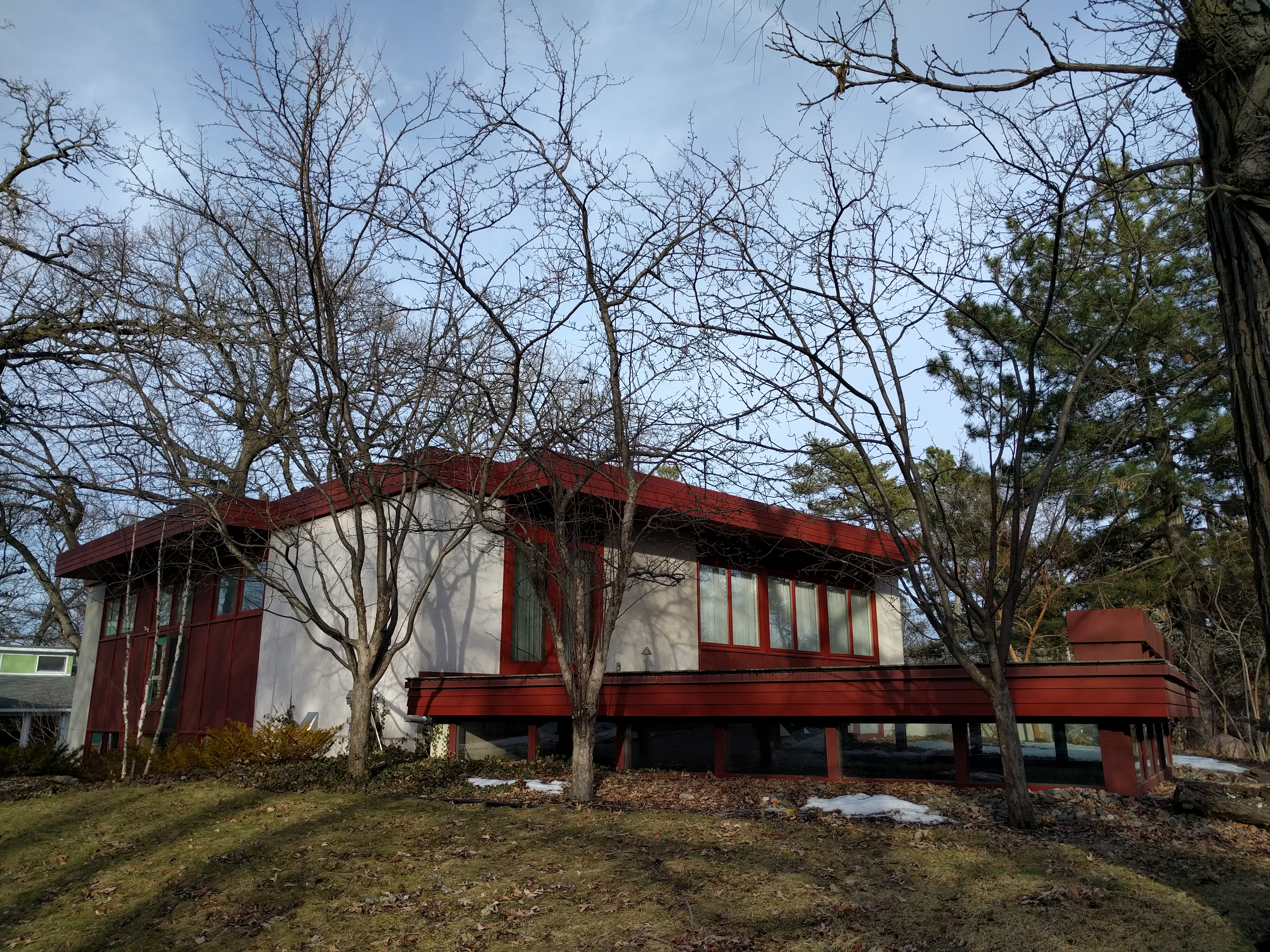

University Grove is a neighborhood of Falcon Heights, Minnesota, known for its 103 homes individually designed by architects. Owners have been required to use an architect since the neighborhood's creation by the University of Minnesota in 1928 to recruit and retain faculty; there is also a cap on costs, ensuring that homes would be of similar size. To balance the individuality of professors/administrators while keeping the properties in the intended group of buyers, each faculty/staff person owns the homes while the university owns the land upon which the home is situated and the faculty/staff person pays rent annually for that land use. The university retains title to the land.

The neighborhood is now especially known for a large collection of homes built in the modern style. The New York Times called University Grove a “living time capsule of vernacular modern architecture in America”. The original landscape plan is by Morel and Nichols. The Grove boasts excellent examples of residential architecture from architects such as Ralph Rapson, Winston and Elizabeth Close, Edwin Hugh Lundie, and Richard Hammel.

The neighborhood continues to mostly house the university community.
