= The Kresge Foundation =

American philanthropic private foundation

- Founded: 1924
- Founder: Sebastian Kresge
- Purpose: Arts and culture, Detroit, education, environment, health, human services, American cities
- Location: Troy, Michigan
- Coordinates: 42°33′38″N 83°11′29″W
- Method: Grants, social investments
- Key people: Rip Rapson (CEO)
- Endowment: $4.3 billion (2021)
- Website: kresge.org

The Kresge Foundation is a philanthropic private foundation headquartered in Troy, Michigan, United States. The foundation works to expand opportunities in America's cities through grantmaking and investing in arts and culture, education, environment, health, human services and community development efforts. The Kresge Foundation is one of wealthiest charitable organizations in the world, with an endowment of $4.3 billion as of June 2021.

== History ==
In 1924, with an initial gift of $1.6 million, Sebastian Kresge established the Kresge Foundation in Detroit. Twelve years earlier, he and partner John G. McCrory opened the first 5-and-10-cent store in Memphis, Tennessee, and parlayed the concept and operations into a chain of stores that were incorporated as the S.S. Kresge Company. In 1977, the enterprise became known as Kmart. The Kresge Foundation and Kmart are no longer affiliated.

Since 2006, the foundation has been led by Rip Rapson, formerly of the McKnight Foundation. He succeeded John Marshall III who had led the foundation for 19 years as president and CEO.

Kresge has practiced strategic philanthropy since completing a transition that began in 2007. Long known for its exclusive use of the challenge grant to help local communities raise funds for major construction and renovation projects, it now employs an array of funding methods to address and advance a set of narrowly defined programmatic objectives. It awards grants and makes program-related investments. Some grants are awarded for a single year; others are for multiple years. Some of its programs accept applications on an ongoing basis. Others proactively invite or solicit applications.

As of early 2019, about 15 percent of the foundation's domestic holdings were in firms owned by women and people of color. In April of that year, the foundation pledged to ramp up investment in women- and minority-owned firms to 25% by 2025. In November 2020, the foundation sent a standardized questionnaire to all of its 150 money-managing firms to measure the diversity of their ownership and compel these firms to diversify their management.

== Investments and grants ==
=== Detroit ===
In the early 2000s, together with the City of Detroit and General Motors, the Kresge Foundation formed the Detroit Riverfront Conservancy as a nonprofit to build and operate the Detroit riverfront. The Kresge Foundation gave a challenge grant of $50 million to the conservancy which was, at the time, the largest grant awarded by the foundation. Over the following two decades, the conservancy has restored and built out 3.5 miles (5.6 km) of River Walk along the Detroit International Riverfront between Belle Isle and Joe Louis Arena, later to be extended to the Ambassador Bridge.

Since the late 2000s, the Kresge Foundation has awarded more than $6 million to more than 250 artists through the awards and fellowships in its Kresge Arts in Detroit program. In 2015, the foundation added the Gilda Awards, named after Gilda Snowden, to recognize emerging artists in Detroit.

In 2010, the foundation invested $35 million into the M-1 Rail (now QLine) project to build 3.4 miles (5.5 km) of streetcar service from Downtown Detroit through Midtown to New Center. In total, the foundation contributed $50 million to the streetcar project which opened in May 2017 at a total cost of $187 million. A gift from the foundation also allowed free rides on the QLine until early September of that year and at various periods in subsequent years.

In January 2013, the foundation pledged $150 million to aid in the implementation of a long-ranging, comprehensive framework for Detroit's future, also known as The Detroit Future City plan. That year, the foundation's Board of Trustees approved 316 awards totaling $122 million; $128 million was paid out to grantees over the course of the year. Kresge's Social Investment Practice made another $17.7 million available to organizations whose efforts support foundation goals through program-related investments. The foundation also played a major part in organizing the "grand bargain" to rescue the city of Detroit from bankruptcy in 2013. Kresge contributed $100 million of the $370 million raised to improve the city's finances. Kresge's CEO Rapson was in large part responsible for organizing several organizations that came together to raise the funds necessary for the plan.

The organization started Kresge Innovative Projects: Detroit (KIPD) in 2015 with a $5-million pilot program to award small grants to restore neighborhoods in Detroit. The program was relaunched in 2018 with $6 million in additional funds. As of August 2020, the program awarded grants to 127 projects in neighborhoods around the city.

In 2017, the Kresge Foundation invested $16 million to stabilize the finances of Marygrove College in Detroit and help develop a plan to transition the 53-acre (21-hectare) forested campus via the Marygrove Conservancy, a nonprofit organization created by the foundation in partnership with University of Michigan and the Detroit Public Schools Community District. The result, the School at Marygrove, is a K–12 school with plans to expand into an institution for the education of students from early childhood to junior college, also known as P–20.

=== National ===
From 2015 to 2020, the Kresge Foundation awarded more than $8.4 million in grants to developments through its FreshLo program which stands for "Fresh, Local & Equitable Initiative". The program awards grants to development projects around the United States that are food-focused in areas that lack access to fresh foods.

In November 2020, the foundation set aside $30 million over three years for nearly 60 organizations focused on racial justice in Detroit, Memphis, Fresno, and New Orleans as well as national civil-rights organizations. Among these were 20 organizations in Detroit that received a total of $8 million.

The Kresge Foundation made a number of financial contributions to help with the response to the COVID-19 pandemic. In 2020, the foundation committed $19 million to help nonprofit organizations weather the pandemic. In Detroit, the foundation committed $2 million to back loans from the Paycheck Protection Program to nonprofits organizations. In March 2021, the foundation also backed a $5-million loan to a Detroit housing agency, United Community Housing Coalition, with $4.5 million guarantee as the agency waited for federal funds from the U.S. Congress to make their way through legislative hurdles. In April, Kresge announced that it would contribute $4.4 million, including $2 million in Detroit, to help with the distribution of COVID-19 vaccines.

Kresge's education program awards more than $10 million in grants to organizations focused on higher education. The foundation favors programs directed at low income students, "especially those living in cities, and underrepresented racial and ethnic groups, including first-generation students; Black, Indigenous, and people of color; veterans; and immigrant students". The education program is focused geographically in Michigan, Florida, California and Texas, and cities such as Detroit, Memphis and New Orleans. The Kresge Foundation also works in one country outside of the United States. The foundation funds and promote South African postsecondary access and success. With the intention of improving student graduation rates.In 2025, the foundation supported The Price of Excellence, a short documentary produced by The Century Foundation and directed by JD Jones examining the historical underfunding of HBCUs relative to peer institutions. The film was filmed at North Carolina Agricultural and Technical State University and premiered at the Congressional Black Caucus Foundation's Annual Legislative Conference on September 25, 2025.

In 2021, the foundation issued a loan guarantee of $4.5 million to the fund for the Memphis Medical District to improve housing and commercial spaces in the neighborhood which has a high poverty rate and a concentration of medical facilities.
