= Goldstein Museum of Design =

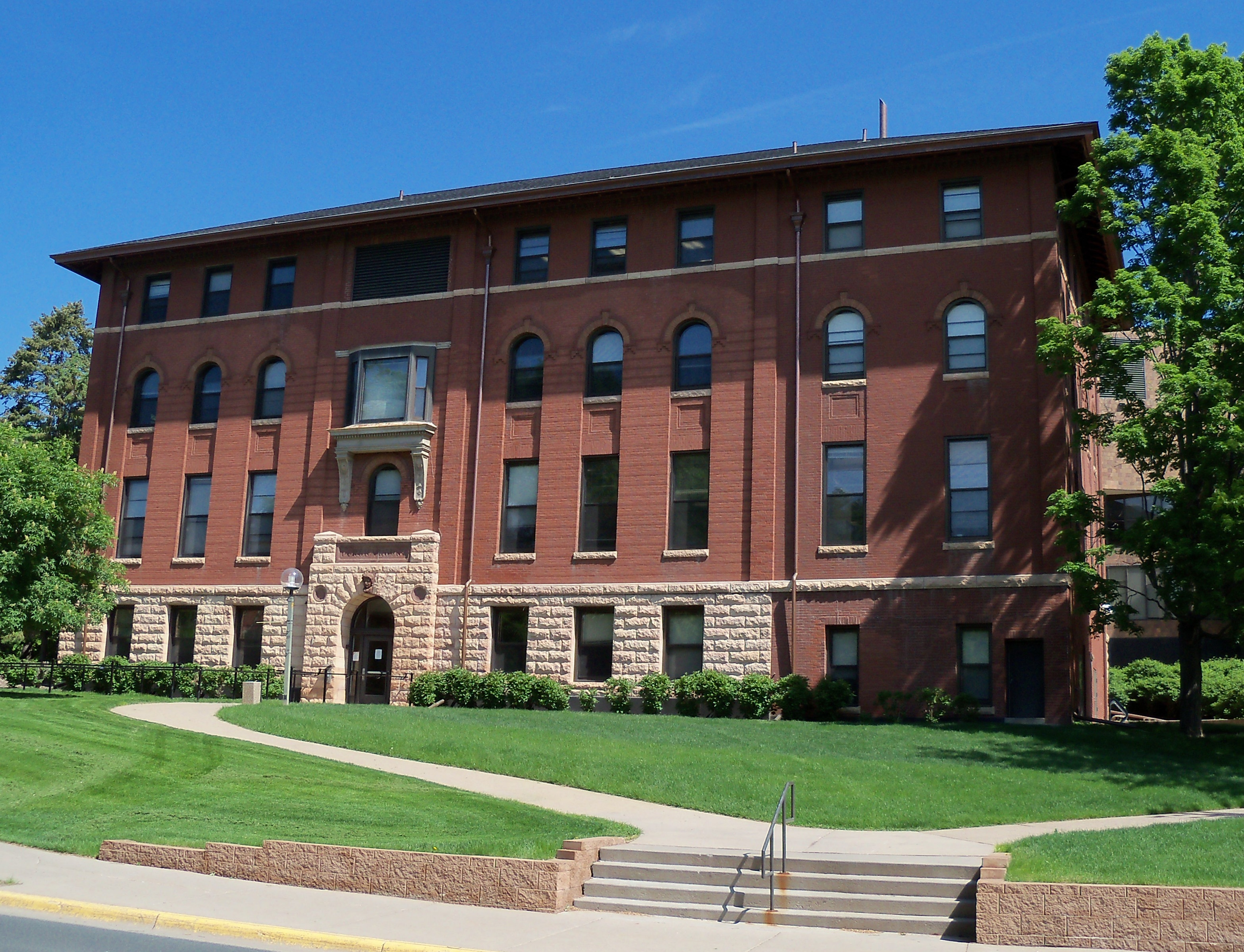
- McNeal Hall
- Former name: Goldstein Gallery
- Established: 1976
- Location: McNeal Hall; 1985 Buford Avenue; Falcon Heights, Minnesota, United States
- Coordinates: 44°59′6.5″N 93°11′0″W
- Type: Design museum
- Director: Aidan O’Connor
- Owner: University of Minnesota College of Design
- Public transit access: Buses 121 Campus Connector or 87 to Buford Avenue
- Parking: Buford Circle or the Gortner Avenue Ramp
- Website: design.umn.edu/goldstein-museum-design

The Goldstein Museum of Design, abbreviated GMD, is a museum on the St. Paul campus of the University of Minnesota. It is part of the university's College of Design. GMD was founded in 1976 and is the only museum in the Upper Midwest specializing in designed objects.

The museum holds around 36,000 objects, about 21,000 of those relating to costume and fashion accessories. GMD promotes object-based learning and the collection is available as a teaching and study resource to students and faculty at the university, professional designers, special interest groups, members of the public, and the local community. Most of GMD's collection was acquired through donation, often from Minnesota residents. About 20% of the collection has been digitally photographed and is available to view on-line.

== History ==
GMD is named after sisters Harriet and Vetta Goldstein, two former teachers in the college of Home Economics, now the College of Design, at the University of Minnesota. The Goldsteins were born in Michigan to Polish Jewish immigrants. Harriet (1883–1974), the elder sister, began teaching at the University of Minnesota in 1910 and Vetta (1890–1982) began teaching there in 1914. To demonstrate examples of good and bad design the sisters collected items of interest for their students to study. The Goldstein sisters were widely traveled, and many of these objects were acquired on their voyages, including a world tour that they took between August 1925 and March 1926, which Harriet documented in a self-published travel journal, Diary of a Trip Around the World. The sisters' interest in design also led to publication of a textbook called Art in Every Day Life. The textbook became a teaching standard, the last edition printed in 1954 after the sisters had retired. English editions of the book were printed in India and the Philippines, and it was even translated into Chinese and used in a college in China by a former pupil of the Goldsteins. Harriet and Vetta both left their teaching posts in 1949, retiring and resigning respectively, and spent the rest of their lives in Los Angeles.

The idea to found the museum came from a former student of the Goldsteins, Natalja Hurley Klingel. Klingel suggested to the Dean of Home Economics, Keith McFarland, that a room or gallery be created specifically to honor Harriet and Vetta. In 1974 the idea was incorporated into designs for the expansion and refurbishment of McNeal Hall, the home of the Design Department. The Goldstein Gallery was finally dedicated on October 14, 1976. Although Harriet had died by then, Vetta was present at the dedication. GMD was originally known as the Goldstein Gallery but over time became The Goldstein: a Museum of Design, and by 2000 was known as the Goldstein Museum of Design.

== Exhibitions ==
GMD hosts up to three exhibitions each year in McNeal Hall and two to three in HGA Gallery, Rapson Hall, School of Architecture, Church Street, Minneapolis on the university's East Bank Campus. Select exhibitions from the 21st century include:

- Interplay: Perspectives of the Design Legacy of Jack Lenor Larsen (2001)
- From Head to Toe: The Finishing Touch – fashion accessories 1800–1959 (2002)
- Bonnie Cashin: An Elegant Solution (2003)
- Mind over Matter, Body Under Design: Bodyworks by Key Sook Geum (2005)
- From Sportswear to Streetwear: American Innovation (2008)
- Good Design: Stories from Herman Miller (2009)
- Flights of Fancy: A History of Feathers in Fashion (2010)
- Beyond Peacocks and Paisleys: Handcrafted Textiles of India and its Neighbors (2011)
- Polarities: Black and White in Design (2011)
- Character in Costume: A Jack Edwards Retrospective (2012)
- Redefining, Redesigning Fashion: Designs for Sustainability (2013)
- Signed by Vera: Scarves by an Iconic Designer (2014)
- America’s Monsters, Superheroes and Villains: 60 years of Toys Referencing Monsters (2015)
- Design Cycles, A Bike Show (2015)

In 2016, GMD celebrated its 40th anniversary with an exhibition featuring forty objects showcasing the range of the collection.

== Collections ==
=== Costume ===
The primary focus of GMD's collection is costume, including around 21,000 items dating back to 1790. This collection includes nearly 1800 hats and 1000 pairs of shoes and boots as well as many other fashion accessories such as purses, gloves, and fans. A select number of costumes are haute couture, including designs by Christian Dior, Elsa Schiaparelli, Coco Chanel, and Yves Saint Laurent. The costume collection began when the Minneapolis-St. Paul Fashion Group, started by Helen Ludwig in 1957, donated many of its fashion garments to GMD. Among the donors was a well-known Minneapolis fashion icon, Margot Seigel, who gave many important pieces. The collection was also boosted by Dayton's, a Minneapolis department store, which donated items from their designer fashion department, the Oval Room. The GMD also holds a large world costume collection, including almost 600 items donated by the International Institute of Minnesota. Other specialist collections include over 1800 scarves designed by Vera Neumann, and over 50 evening gowns by Oscar de la Renta.

=== Textiles, decorative arts, and graphic design ===
GMD holds about 5,000 textile items, including a large collection of fabrics designed by Jack Lenor Larsen after the designer's archive was donated in part to the University of Minnesota. There are also around 2,500 decorative arts items, many from the collections of the Goldsteins. Notable holdings include a collection of art pottery pieces from the 1920s donated by Ruth Hanold Crane, and a collection of over fifty Chinese and Japanese curios, including snuff bottles and jade figures, donated by Robert Soman. The GMD collection also includes some 660 graphic design items, including a complete set of Emigre design magazines from 1984 to 2005. More recently, GMD has begun building a product design collection, which includes tea kettles by Michael Graves and Aldo Rossi for Allessi, a first generation iPad, and juicers by Philippe Starck.

== Directors ==
- Gertrude Esteros (1976–1980)
- Mary Stieglitz-Witte (1981–1982)
- Joanne B. Eicher (1983–1987)
- Marla C. Berns (1988–1991)
- Suzanne Beizermann (1991–1997)
- Lindsey Shen (1997–2005)
- Lin Nelson-Mayson (2005–2021)
- Jean McElvain (2021–2023)
- Aidan O'Connor (2023–present)
