= Hendrik and Marri Oskam House =

- U.S. National Register of Historic Places
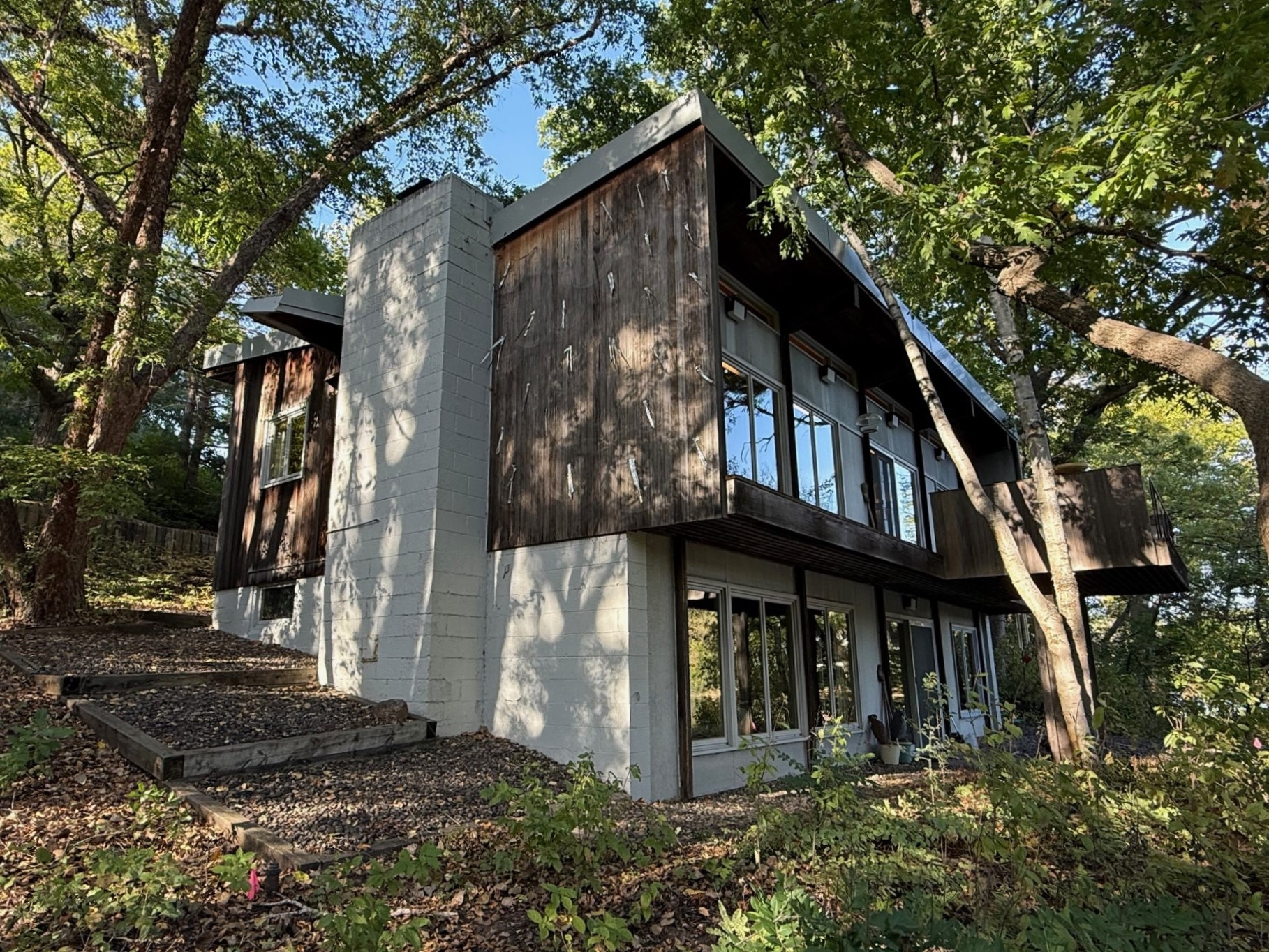

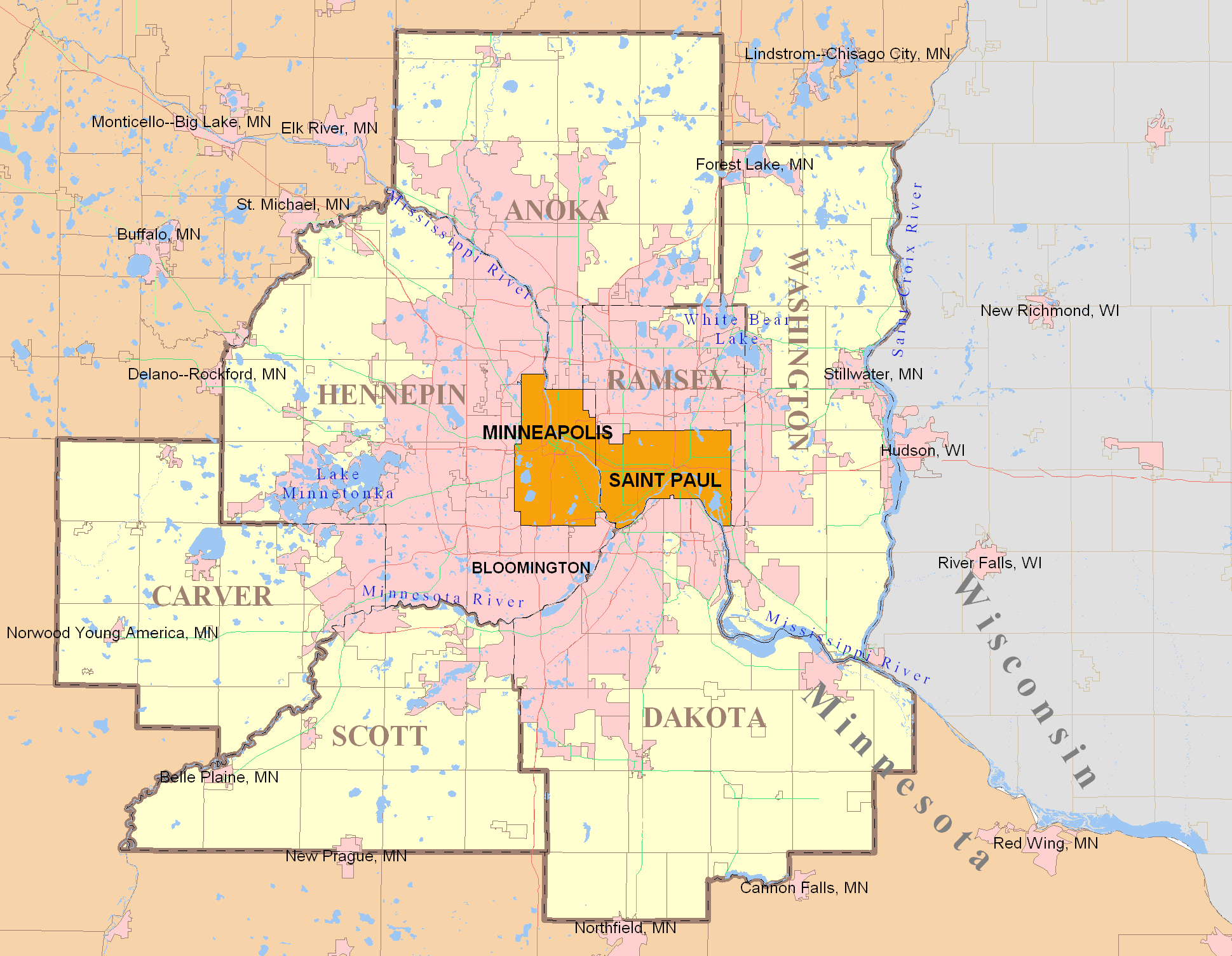
- Location within Minneapolis–Saint Paul
- Location: 6901 Dakota Trail, Edina, Minnesota, USA
- Coordinates: 44.8783°N 93.3893°W
- Area: Indian Hills
- Built: 1962-1964
- Architect: Close Associates
- Architectural style: International Style
- NRHP reference No.: 100011339
- Added to NRHP: January 29, 2025

The Hendrik and Marri Oskam House is a single-family residence located at 6901 Dakota Trail in Edina, Minnesota, United States. The property was designed in the International Style by the architectural firm Close Associates and completed in 1964. It was listed on the National Register of Historic Places on January 29, 2025, for its architectural significance and its association with architect Elizabeth “Lisl” Close.

== History ==
Hendrik Oskam, a plasma physicist, and his wife Marrigje (Marri) Oskam moved to Minnesota from the Netherlands in 1958 when Hendrik joined the engineering faculty at the University of Minnesota. The couple commissioned Close Associates to design their residence shortly after their arrival in the state. Construction of the house was completed in 1962.

== Architecture ==
The Oskam House is a two-level residence built in the International Style, featuring a rectangular plan, a butterfly roof, and post-and-beam construction. The structure is integrated into a sloping half-acre site overlooking Indianhead Lake in Edina. Exterior walls are clad in vertically grooved redwood siding.

The interior incorporates an open plan with geometric forms, flat surfaces, and exposed structural elements consistent with modernist design principles. Indirect lighting is used throughout the interior spaces. Brick pavers are installed in the kitchen and other functional areas, reflecting Dutch vernacular architectural influences. Carpeted floors are used in the living room, study, and bedrooms.

== National Register of Historic Places ==
The property was nominated to the National Register of Historic Places for its architectural significance as an intact example of residential work by Elizabeth “Lisl” Close, a prominent modernist architect in Minnesota. The nomination was approved at the state level in 2024 and officially listed in 2025.

== See also ==
- National Register of Historic Places listings in Hennepin County, Minnesota
