= Rip Rapson =

American attorney and philanthropist

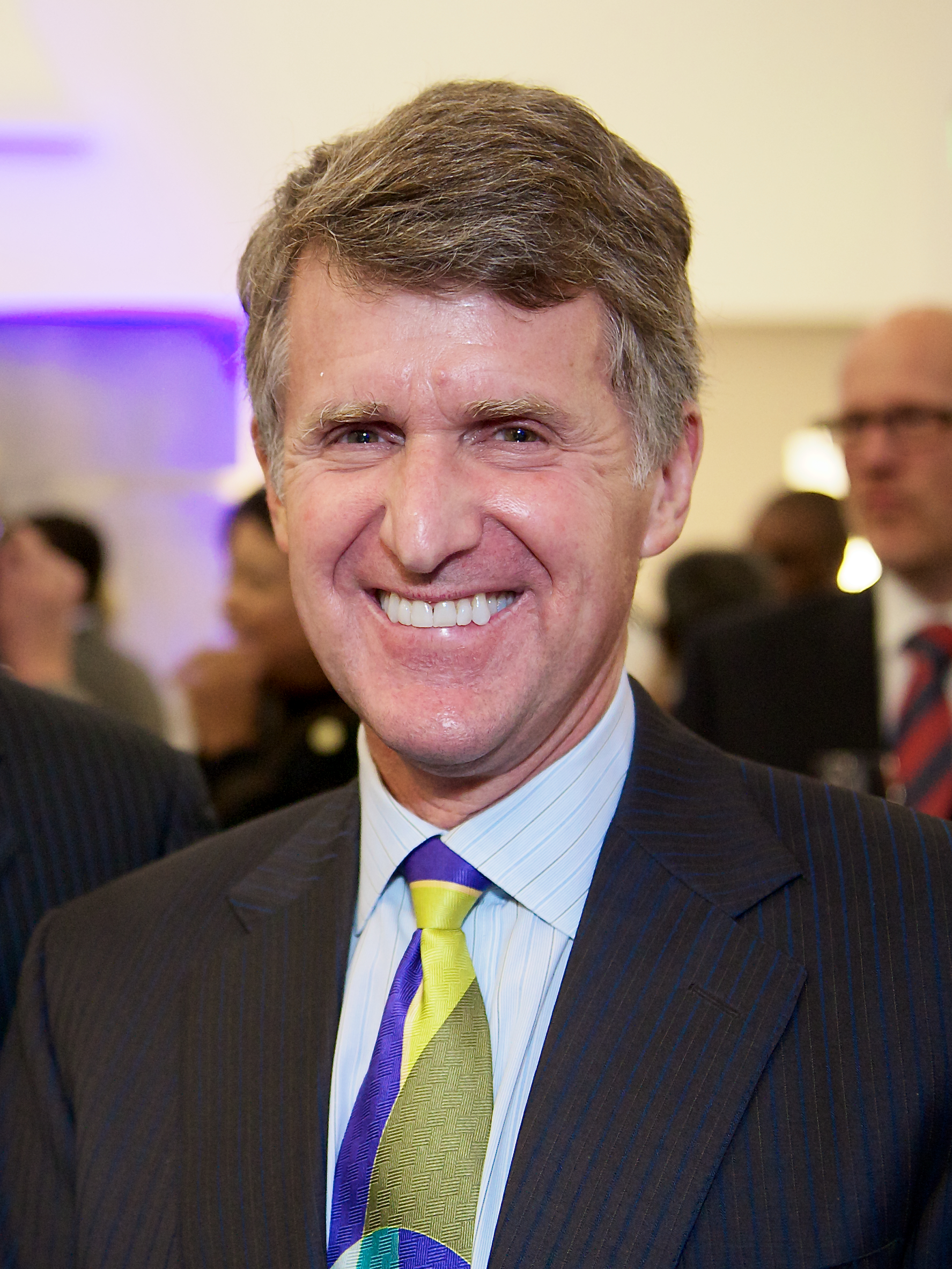
- Born: Richard Rapson; March 16, 1952 (age 74); Bonn, Germany
- Education: Pomona College (BA); Columbia University (JD)
- Title: CEO of Kresge Foundation
- Term: 2006–present
- Spouse: Gail Johnson (m. 1989)
- Children: 2
- Father: Ralph Rapson

Deputy Mayor of Minneapolis
- In office April 15, 1989 – 1993
- Preceded by: Jan Hively

Richard "Rip" Rapson (born March 16, 1952) is an American attorney and the CEO of the Kresge Foundation. He began his career as a congressional aide to Donald M. Fraser during Fraser's last two terms in the United States House of Representatives. After attending Columbia Law School, Rapson joined the law firm of Leonard, Street & Deinard to practice law while also being on the board of several organizations. In 1989, Fraser, who had become mayor of Minneapolis, appointed Rapson as his deputy mayor and, in 1993, Rapson unsuccessfully ran for mayor to succeed Fraser.

After leaving the Minneapolis City Hall, Rapson became a fellow at the University of Minnesota and then was appointed president of the McKnight Foundation in Minneapolis. In 2006, he moved to the Detroit area to become CEO of the Kresge Foundation. He has led the foundation in a number of philanthropic endeavors to revitalize and rescue Detroit from bankruptcy.

== Early life and education ==
Richard "Rip" Rapson was born on March 16, 1952, in Bonn, Germany, to Mary and Ralph Rapson. In 1954, the family moved to Minneapolis, Minnesota, where Ralph became head of the University of Minnesota School of Architecture and a prolific architect in the city. Mary said that their son was nicknamed Rip because he was "kicking and moving" even in the womb. He has a younger brother, Thomas ("Toby"), who also became an architect at their father's architectural firm.

At Marshall-University High School, Rip Rapson was a baseball pitcher, played basketball, tennis and learned to play the trumpet. He chose to attend Pomona College in California which he believed had a good tennis team. In 1974, he graduated magna cum laude from Pomona with a bachelor of arts degree in political science.

== Career ==
After college, Rapson was hired by Arvonne Fraser, who ran her husband Donald M. Fraser's offices in Washington, D.C., when he was a United States representative from Minnesota. Rapson was a congressional aide from 1974 to 1978 during Fraser's last two terms in the U.S. congress. He worked as a liaison between Fraser's Washington office and his local district office in Minneapolis as well as contributing to the writing and passage of the Boundary Waters Canoe Area Wilderness Act of 1978 to protect the Boundary Waters Canoe Area in Minnesota.

Rapson then graduated from Columbia Law School with a J.D. and joined the law firm of Leonard, Street & Deinard. He became a partner at the firm and remained there from 1981 to 1988. He also was on the Library Board, the Board of Estimates and Taxation, and the boards of 13 other organizations in the city during that period.

On March 14, 1989, Fraser, who had become mayor of Minneapolis, appointed Rapson as his deputy mayor, effective April 15, 1989, to succeed Jan Hively. As deputy mayor, Rapson was in charge of liaisoning with the Minneapolis City Council. He was also responsible for the creation of a $400 million Neighborhood Revitalization Program and chaired its implementation committee.

Rapson ran in the 1993 Minneapolis mayoral elections against Richard Jefferson, a member of the Minnesota House of Representatives, and Sharon Sayles-Belton, president of the city council. Rapson relied on a grassroots campaign, receiving only 4% of his funding from political action committees.

After his unsuccessful bid for mayor of Minneapolis, Rapson accepted a senior fellowship at the University of Minnesota. He then worked for six years as president of the McKnight Foundation in Minneapolis.

In 2006, Rapson was appointed CEO of the Kresge Foundation, a foundation based in Troy, Michigan, a suburb of Detroit. He was responsible for a number of large grant programs made by the foundation including a $100-million grant to bring financial stability to the Detroit Institute of Arts whose art collection was owned by the city when it went bankrupt in 2013 and was being considered for sale to cover the city's debt. Together with Gerald Rosen, a U.S. district court chief judge, and Darren Walker of the Ford Foundation which chipped in another $125 million, Rapson helped organize a "grand bargain" as proposed by Judge Rosen, with other contributions from a number of foundations and the state of Michigan, to keep the art collection from being liquidated and help preserve pensions for city retirees, whose retirement funds were also at risk.

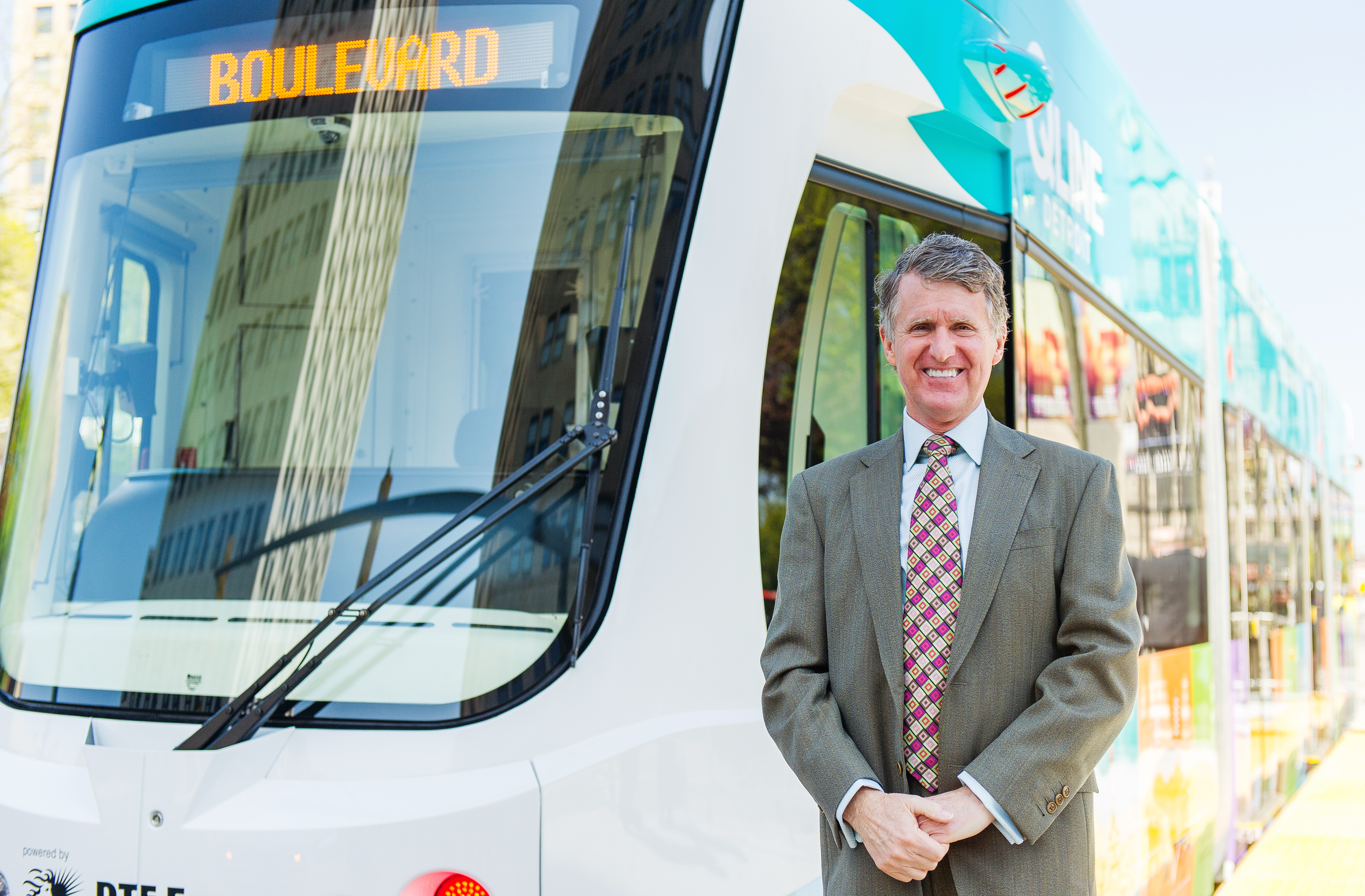
Rapson at the May 2017 opening of the QLine streetcar in Detroit, Michigan

Under his leadership, the foundation contributed $150 million to the implementation of the Detroit Future City plan to revitalize the city and also spurred the development of the QLine streetcar project in downtown Detroit. Rapson is a founding member on the board of directors of M-1 Rail, a non-profit organization which built, owns, and operates the QLine. He is on the Detroit board of directors of the Federal Reserve Bank of Chicago. As CEO of the Kresge Foundation, as of 2017, Rapson manages the organization's $3.8 billion in assets and 105 full-time employees.

== Personal life ==
Rapson married Gail Johnson in August 1989. They have two children.

== Bibliography ==
- Proescholdt, Kevin; Rapson, Rip; Heinselman, Miron L. (1995). Troubled Waters: The Fight for the Boundary Waters Canoe Area Wilderness. North Star Press of St. Cloud. ISBN 978-0-878391-00-4.
- Hession, Jane King; Rapson, Ralph; Rapson, Rip; Wright, Bruce N. (1999). Ralph Rapson: Sixty Years of Modern Design. Afton Historical Society Press. ISBN 978-1-890434-14-4.
