= Indianhead Lake =

Lake in Minnesota, U.S.

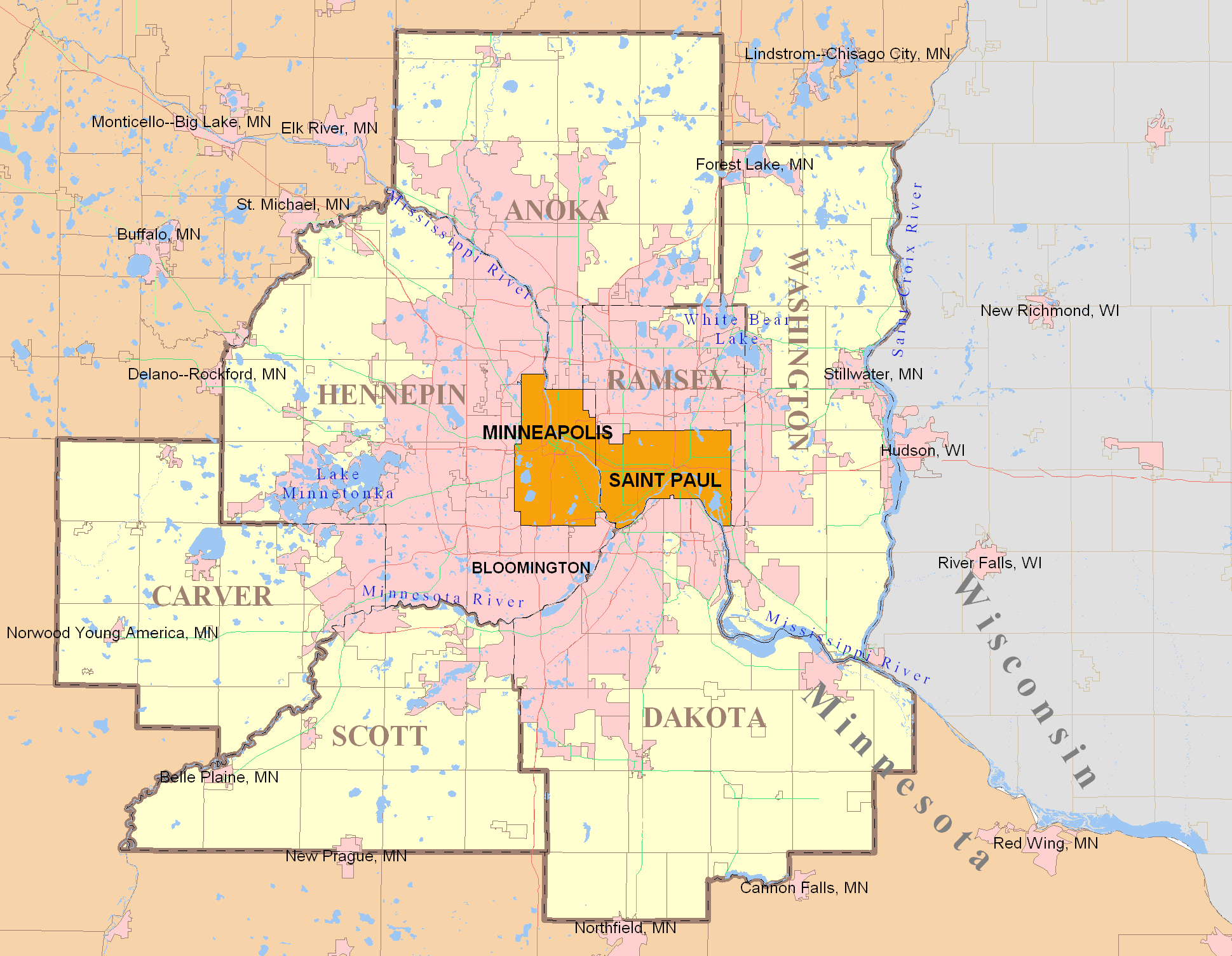
- Location in Minneapolis-St. Paul metro
- Location: Hennepin County, Minnesota
- Coordinates: 44°52′46″N 93°23′15″W
- Type: Lake
- Surface area: 14 acres (5.7 ha)
- Max. depth: 7 feet (2.1 m)
- Settlements: Edina, Minnesota

Indianhead Lake is a shallow lake located in the city of Edina, Minnesota. The lake is situated east of Minnesota State Highway 169 within the Nine Mile Creek watershed.

== Characteristics ==
Indianhead Lake covers approximately 14 acres. The lake has a maximum depth of about 7 feet and an average depth of 4.7 feet. Its drainage area is approximately 114 acres, consisting primarily of residential land that drains to the lake through storm sewers and overland flow. The lake is a landlocked basin with no surface outlet.

== Water quality ==
Monitoring by the Nine Mile Creek Watershed District has found that Indianhead Lake has poor water quality. Measurements for phosphorus and water clarity have failed to meet Minnesota state standards for shallow lakes. Data collected in 2020 indicated that the lake was impaired due to nutrient accumulation. The lack of an outlet limits water flushing, contributing to nutrient buildup during large rain events.

In August 2025, the City of Edina issued a recreational water advisory after detecting blue‑green algae at levels associated with potential health risks.

== Aquatic vegetation and wildlife ==
A 2020 plant survey recorded three aquatic plant species in the lake, two of which were invasive. Chemical control of submerged aquatic vegetation began in 1973 under a Minnesota Department of Natural Resources permit and continued annually through 2019.

In 2013, residents stocked the lake with 50 black crappie, 200 bluegill sunfish, and 200 largemouth bass. It was stocked again in 2016 with larger numbers of the same species.

== Recreation ==
Indianhead Lake has no public boat launch. Only non‑motorized boats are permitted on the lake.

== Nearby ==
The Hendrik and Marri Oskam House from the National Register of Historic Places is located on the southwest corner of the lake.

== See also ==
- List of lakes in Minnesota
