= University of Minnesota College of Design =

College of Design
- Former names: College of Architecture and Landscape Architecture
- Established: 2006
- Parent institution: University of Minnesota - Twin Cities
- Dean: Prasad Boradkar
- Location: 107 Rapson Hall, 89 Church Street SE, Minneapolis, MN 55455
- Website: http://design.umn.edu/

University of Minnesota College of Design is located on both the Saint Paul and Minneapolis campuses of the University of Minnesota-Twin Cities. The College of Design includes the full range of design disciplines and is home to eight undergraduate majors in the fields of architecture, apparel design, graphic design, interior design, landscape architecture, product design, and retail merchandising. There are 23 graduate degree programs, eight undergraduate minors, nine research centers, and the Goldstein Museum of Design.

== Campuses ==
The College of Design is located on both the Minneapolis and St. Paul campuses of the University of Minnesota Twin Cities. The programs of apparel design, graphic design, interior design, housing studies, and retail merchandising are located in McNeal Hall on the St. Paul campus. The Goldstein Museum of Design is also located in McNeal Hall. On the Minneapolis campus the College of Design is located in Rapson Hall, where the architecture, landscape architecture, and product design programs are housed, and at 1425 University Ave. where the Center for Sustainable Building Research and two studio spaces are located.

== Leadership ==
Dr. Prasad Boradkar (2023–present) is the current dean of the University of Minnesota's College of Design. He is a designer, anthropologist, educator, and researcher with several years of experience leading design and research teams in both academia and industry. Most recently Boradkar served as UX research and sustainability lead at Google's Advanced Technology & Projects Division, where he led efforts on user experience research and sustainable development for health and wellness products.

Carol Strohecker (2017–2023)

Previously, Strohecker was vice provost for academic affairs at the Rhode Island School of Design (RISD). Prior to RISD, she was the inaugural director of the University of North Carolina's multicampus Center for Design Innovation. Strohecker conducted research on learning environment design and technology-enhanced learning at Media Lab Europe (the European partner of the MIT Media Lab) and Mitsubishi Electric Research Labs. She holds a Ph.D. in Media Arts and Sciences and a Master of Science in Visual Studies. Both degrees are from Massachusetts Institute of Technology.

Becky Yust, Interim Dean (2015–2017)

Becky Yust served as interim dean of the College of Design from 2015 to 2017. Yust is a professor of housing studies.

Thomas Fisher, Dean (2006–2015)

Tom Fisher served as the inaugural dean of the College of Design, leading the college from its creation in 2006 through 2015. Previously, Fisher spent ten years as dean of the University of Minnesota School of Architecture and Landscape Architecture. He is now director of the College of Design's Minnesota Design Center and holds the position of Dayton Hudson Land Grant Chair in Urban Design.

== Programs ==
- Apparel Design: B.S.
- Apparel Studies: M.A., M.S., Ph.D.
- Architecture: B.D.A., B.S., M.Arch., M.Heritage Studies & Public History, M.S. Heritage Preservation, M.S. Metropolitan Design, M.S. Research Practices, M.S. Sustainable Design, Undergraduate Minor
- Ecological Restoration: Graduate Minor
- Fashion Studies: Undergraduate Minor
- Graphic Design: B.F.A., M.A., M.S., M.F.A., Ph.D.
- Health Care Design and Innovation: Post-Baccalaureate Certificate
- Housing Studies: M.A., M.S., Ph.D., Post-Baccalaureate Certificate
- Human Factors & Ergonomics: M.S., Ph.D., Graduate Minor
- Interdisciplinary Design: Undergraduate Minor
- Interior Environments: Undergraduate Minor
- Interior Design: B.S., M.A., M.S., Ph.D.
- Landscape Architecture: M.S., M.L.A.
- Landscape Design & Planning: B.E.D., Undergraduate Minor
- Metropolitan Design: Post-Baccalaureate Certificate
- Museum Studies: Graduate Minor
- Product Design: B.S., Undergraduate & Graduate Minor
- Retail Merchandising: B.S., Undergraduate Minor
- User Experience Design: B.S., Undergraduate Minor

== Research and Outreach Centers ==
- Center for Changing Landscapes: Managed jointly by the College of Design and the College for Food, Agricultural, and Natural Resource Sciences, the Center for Changing Landscapes offers social science research, conservation program evaluation, sustainable landscape design, community assessment training, and other services to natural resource agencies, non-profit organizations, and communities throughout Minnesota and beyond.
- Center for Design in Health:
- Center for Sustainable Building Research:
- Center for World Heritage Studies: The Center for World Heritage Studies works with UNESCO's World Heritage Center to conduct research and provide education on protection, conservation, and enhancement of global heritage.
- Digital Design Center: Jointly managed by the College of Science and Engineering.
- Goldstein Museum of Design: Located on the St. Paul campus in McNeal Hall, the Goldstein Museum of Design was founded in 1976 is the only museum in the Upper Midwest specializing in designed objects.
- Minnesota Design Center:
- Midwest Universities Radon Consortium: Founded in 1989, the consortium is one of only three Regional Radon Training Centers established by the U.S. Environmental Protection Agency.
- Wearable Product Design Center: Advances the design of wearable products and includes the College of Design's Human Dimensioning Lab and the Wearable Technology Lab.
