= Pallavi Tiwari =

Indian American engineer and academic

- Born: India
- Education: Shri Govindram Seksaria Institute of Technology and Science; Rutgers University
- Scientific career
- Workplaces: University of Wisconsin–Madison; Case Western Reserve University
- Thesis: Quantitative integration of imaging and non-imaging data : application to integrating multi-parametric MRI for prostate cancer diagnosis, grading and treatment evaluation (2012)
- Website: Integrated Diagnostics and Analytics (IDiA) Laboratory for Precision Medicine

Pallavi Tiwari is an Indian American biomedical engineer who is a professor at the University of Wisconsin–Madison. Her research considers the development of computer algorithms to accelerate the diagnosis and treatment of disease. She was elected Fellow of the National Academy of Inventors.

== Early life and education ==
Tiwari is from India. She said that her parents always encouraged her to study science, and valued higher education. She attended the Kendriya Vidyalaya high school, and moved to the Shri Govindram Seksaria Institute of Technology and Science for undergraduate studies. She became inspired by biomedical engineering whilst she was at college, developing wearable technologies to help people with visible impairments. She moved to Rutgers University for her doctoral research, where she worked with a surgeon to analyze human error in surgery.

== Research and career ==
At Case Western Reserve University, Tiwari built machine learning algorithms that could accelerate the diagnosis of disease from medical images. In particular, Tiwari creates artificial intelligence tools to assess magnetic resonance imaging data and determine whether body tissue contains malignancies. At Case Western, she served as Director of the Brain Image Computing (BrIC) Laboratory.

Tiwari joined the University of Wisconsin–Madison in 2022, where she was made co-director of the UW Carbone Cancer Center.

== Awards and honors ==
- 2018: Crain's Business Cleveland Forty Under 40
- 2020: Johnson & Johnson Women in STEM^{2}D Scholars Award
- 2021: Society for Imaging Informatics in Medicine
- 2023: Elected Fellow of the National Academy of Inventors

== Selected publications ==
- Bakas, Spyridon; et al. (2019). Identifying the Best Machine Learning Algorithms for Brain Tumor Segmentation, Progression Assessment, and Overall Survival Prediction in the BRATS Challenge. Apollo-University of Cambridge Repository. arXiv:1811.02629. doi:10.17863/CAM.38755. S2CID 53225711.
- Nathaniel M Braman; Maryam Etesami; Prateek Prasanna; Christina Dubchuk; Hannah Gilmore; Pallavi Tiwari; Donna Plecha; Anant Madabhushi (2017). "Intratumoral and peritumoral radiomics for the pretreatment prediction of pathological complete response to neoadjuvant chemotherapy based on breast DCE-MRI". Breast Cancer Research. 19 (1): 57. doi:10.1186/s13058-017-0846-1. PMC 5437672. PMID 28521821. Wikidata Q33706962. (Erratum: doi:10.1186/s13058-017-0862-1, PMC 5502485, PMID 28693537, Wikidata Q42332101)
- Prateek Prasanna; Jay Patel; Sasan Partovi; Anant Madabhushi; Pallavi Tiwari (2016). "Radiomic features from the peritumoral brain parenchyma on treatment-naïve multi-parametric MR imaging predict long versus short-term survival in glioblastoma multiforme: Preliminary findings". European Radiology. 27 (10): 4188–4197. doi:10.1007/s00330-016-4637-3. PMC 5403632. PMID 27778090. Wikidata Q36173696. (Erratum: doi:10.1007/s00330-017-4815-y, PMID 28608160, Wikidata Q48024320)
