= Deborah Watkins Bruner =

American researcher, clinical trialist, and academic

Deborah Watkins Bruner is an American researcher, clinical trialist, and academic. She is the senior vice president for research at Emory University. Her research focus is on patient reported outcomes, symptom management across cancer sites, effectiveness of radiotherapy modalities, and the microbiome and cancer. Bruner's research has been continually funding since 1998, with total funding of her research exceeding $180 million. She is ranked among the top five percent of all National Institutes of Health-funded investigators worldwide since 2012, according to the Blue Ridge Institute for Medical Research.

== Biography ==
Bruner is professor and Robert W. Woodruff Chair in Nursing at the Nell Hodgson Woodruff School of Nursing, professor of radiation oncology at the Emory University School of Medicine, and a member of the Winship Cancer Institute.

She earned a degree in nursing from West Chester University and M.S. degrees in nursing administration and nursing oncology from Widener University. In 1999, she earned a Ph.D. in nursing with a focus on outcomes research from the University of Pennsylvania, supervised by Rosalyn J. Watts. She held roles at the Fox Chase Cancer Center prior to joining the faculty at the University of Pennsylvania as professor of nursing in 2009.

Bruner joined the Winship Cancer Institute of Emory University in 2011 as associate director for outcomes research and professor of nursing and radiation oncology. She then served as assistant dean for faculty mentoring and advancement in the Woodruff School of Nursing.

== Leadership ==
In 2015, she was appointed by President Barack Obama to the National Cancer Advisory Board where she was the only nurse to serve on the board. She was elected to the National Academy of Medicine in 2016 where she has coauthored reports related to radioactive sources and cancer and diagnosing and treating adults cancers and associated impairments.

In October 2018, Bruner was named Senior Vice President for Research, Emory University, where she focused on interdisciplinary research. In announcing her appointment, University President Claire Sterk said ““With Bruner’s leadership and expertise, Emory will be even better positioned to address 21st century challenges through increased discovery and intellectual imagination and innovation.”

Her global work includes leading a 2018 partnership project to assist in opening the first modern radiotherapy in Ethiopia through 3D treatment planning and quality assurance. As the co-chair of National Cancer Institute’s Global Health Working Group, her role is to review the NCI global portfolio and provide recommendations for the allocation of NCI’s resources.

In 2020, Bruner was instrumental in bringing Science Gallery, the world’s only university network dedicated to public engagement with science and art, to Atlanta, Georgia. Emory University became the second U.S.-based Science Gallery location.

== Research ==
Bruner is the first and only nurse to ever lead as principal investigator for the National Cancer Institute National Clinical Trials Network Cancer Control Programs. She was Principal Investigator (PI) of the Radiation Therapy Oncology group (RTOG-Community Clinical Oncology Program) and currently serves as multi-PI of the NRG Oncology-National Clinical Oncology Research Program. She has led or been a member of numerous NCI committees related to clinical trials. Her research focuses on patient-reported outcomes (PROs), symptom management clinical trials across cancer sites and patient recruitment to clinical trials. Her current research is focused on the microbiome and cancer.

== Publications ==
Bruner has published more than 250 peer-reviewed journal articles, and 16 books/book chapters. She has served as editor-in-chief of one book and three editions of an ONS Guidelines Manual for radiation oncology nursing. Her collaborative research has been published in scientific and academic publications including the International Journal of Radiation Oncology, The Journal of the National Cancer Institute, Neuro Oncology, and the New England Journal of Medicine.

=== Highly cited articles ===
- 2022 "Effect of electronic symptom monitoring on patient-reported outcomes among patients with metastatic cancer: a randomized clinical trial.” In the Journal of the American Medical Association 327(24):2413-2422.
- 2020 "Hippocampal avoidance during whole-brain radiotherapy plus memantine for patients with brain metastases: phase III trial NRG Oncology CC001.” In the Journal of Clinical Oncology 38(10):1019-1029.
- 2018 "Effect of standard vs dose-escalated radiation therapy for patients with intermediate- risk prostate cancer: the NRG Oncology RTOG 0126 randomized clinical trial. In the Journal of the American Medical Association Oncology 4(6):e180039.
- 2018 "The gut microbiome, symptoms, and targeted interventions in children with cancer: a systematic review." In Supportive Care in Cancer 26.2: 427-439.
- 2014 "Recommended patient-reported core set of symptoms to measure in adult cancer treatment trials." In JNCI: Journal of the National Cancer Institute 106.7.
- 2013 "Memantine for the prevention of cognitive dysfunction in patients receiving whole-brain radiotherapy: a randomized, double-blind, placebo-controlled trial." In Neuro-oncology 15.10: 1429-1437.
- 2013 "Preliminary toxicity analysis of 3-dimensional conformal radiation therapy versus intensity modulated radiation therapy on the high-dose arm of the Radiation Therapy Oncology Group 0126 prostate cancer trial." In the International Journal of Radiation Oncology, Biology, Physics 87.5: 932-938.
- 2011 "Palliative radiotherapy for bone metastases: an ASTRO evidence-based guideline." In International Journal of Radiation Oncology, Biology, Physics 79.4: 965-976.
- 2011,"Radiotherapy and short-term androgen deprivation for localized prostate cancer." New England Journal of Medicine 365.2: 107-118.
- 2005 "Randomized trial of short-versus long-course radiotherapy for palliation of painful bone metastases.” In Journal of the National Cancer Institute 97.11: 798-804.
- 2003 "Relative risk of prostate cancer for men with affected relatives: systematic review and meta‐analysis." In International Journal of Cancer 107.5: 797-803.
- 1993 "Vaginal stenosis and sexual function following intracavitary radiation for the treatment of cervical and endometrial carcinoma." In International Journal of Radiation Oncology, Biology, Physics 27.4: 825-830.

== Awards and memberships ==
- 2025 Top 50 Women Leaders in Education for 2025, by Women We Admire organization The Top 50 Women Leaders in Education for 2025 (Complete) – Women We Admire
- 2025 Elected to Honorary Member of the National Academy of Inventors
- 2025 Inducted into International Women’s Forum (Georgia Chapter)
- 2022 Welch/Woerner Path-Paver Award, Friends of the National Institute of Nursing Research
- 2021 Champion and Changemakers in Commemoration of the 50th Anniversary of the National Cancer Act, one of only 14 scientists recognized in the area of cancer prevention and control
- 2020 Claire M. Fagin Distinguished Researcher Award, University of Pennsylvania’s School of Nursing (lecture presented in 2021 due to Pandemic) VIDEO https://www.youtube.com/watch?v=wn34fheIMLE
- 2020 Hugh P. Davis Endowed Lecture, Nell Hodgson Woodruff School of Nursing, Emory University (lecture presented in 2021 due to Pandemic) VIDEO https://www.youtube.com/watch?v=c-7fpUJkSV8&list=PLKU6M-SpCOWUI8DOLo8OwrLLFCIKWqGuI&index=4&t=411s
- 2019 Outstanding Alumni Award from the University of Pennsylvania’s School of Nursing
- 2018 Rose Mary Carroll-Johnson Distinguished Award for Consistent Contribution to Nursing Literature, Oncology Nursing Society
- 2018 Appointed National Cancer Institute Global Health Working Group Co-Chair
- 2016 Elected to National Academy of Medicine
- 2016 Induction, International Nurse Researcher Hall of Fame, Sigma Theta Tau
- 2015-2020 U.S. Presidential appointment to the National Cancer Advisory Board, NCI
- 2015 Distinguished Researcher Award, Oncology Nursing Society
- 2011 Named Robert W. Woodruff Chair in Nursing, Emory University
- 2004 Excellence in Radiation Oncology, Oncology Nursing Society/Varian Nursing Award
