= Madabhushi =

Madabhushi (మాడభూషి) is a patronymic surname from India.

1. Anant Madabhushi
2. Madabhushi Ananthasayanam Ayyangar (1891 – 1978) was the first Deputy Speaker and then Speaker of the Lok Sabha in the Indian Parliament.
