= Case Western Reserve University Department of Biomedical Engineering =

American biomedical engineering program

The Case Western Reserve University Department of Biomedical Engineering launched in 1968 as one of the first biomedical engineering programs in the world. Formally incorporated in both the School of Engineering and School of Medicine, the department provides full research and education programs and is consistently top-ranked for graduate and undergraduate studies, according to U.S. News & World Report.

== Location ==
The program is headquartered in the Wickenden Building on the Case Western Reserve University campus in Cleveland, Ohio.

== Medical research collaborations ==
The Department of Biomedical Engineering faculty and students collaborate on medical research with: Case Western Reserve University School of Medicine, University Hospitals Case Medical Center, Cleveland Clinic, Louis Stokes Cleveland VA Medical Center, and MetroHealth Medical Center

== History ==
=== 1960s ===
The Case Institute of Technology launched the Engineering Design Center in 1960, from which the department would later emerge.

- 1962 – Plans developed to enroll graduate students from the existing Systems Research Center, Engineering Design Center and the Environmental Health Program, and the Western Reserve University School of Medicine, into a graduate biomedical engineering program. Case added an undergraduate elective sequence in biomedical engineering.
- The following year, it was the first such program to receive a National Institutes of Health (NIH) training grant.
- 1965 - Gate Control Theory of Pain is proposed by Melzack et al.
- 1966 - Researchers Shealy, Mortimer and Reswick discover how to apply the Gate Control Theory of Pain to large sensory nerve fibers entering the spinal cord, thereby discovering Spinal Cord Stimulation to treat Pain.
- 1967 - Shealy, Mortimer and Reswick publish the first clinical paper on neuromodulation for the control of pain on the dorsal root column of the spinal cord
- 1967 – Case Institute of Technology merged with Western Reserve University to form Case Western Reserve University. The Biomedical Engineering Division was created.
- 1968 – The Board of Trustees approved the formation of the Department of Biomedical Engineering at Case Western Reserve University. University trustees approved the Department of Biomedical Engineering, then one of only six in the country.
- 1969 – Case Western Reserve created the first MD/PhD program.

=== 1970s ===
1972 – Case Western Reserve became one of the first schools to offer a bachelor's degree in biomedical engineering, with tracks in materials, instrumentation/electronics and systems/controls. The undergraduate program was one of the first accredited by the Engineers' Council for Professional Development (which later became the Accreditation Board for Engineering and Technology). 1977- The department's first hospital-based program, the Rehabilitation Engineering Center was created in relationship with MetroHealth Medical Center (then Cleveland Metropolitan General Hospital), the Cleveland VA Medical Center and the Department of Orthopaedics of the Case Western Reserve School of Medicine.

=== 1980s ===
The department had approximately 80 graduate students and 60 undergraduates. By the end of the decade, enrollment topped 100 graduate students and 120 undergraduates. A Whitaker Foundation Special Opportunities grant and NSF grant supported a computer system for an image-computing laboratory.

=== 1990s ===
Throughout the 1990s, the department was consistently ranked among the top five in the nation by U.S. News & World Report. 1996 – The department received a multimillion-dollar Whitaker Development Award, which spurred a shift to biomedical engineering at the cellular and molecular levels. An NIH facilities grant allowed a space increase and renovation of the Wickenden building. 1997 – The student body exceeded 200 undergraduate students and 120 graduate students. 1999 – The Cleveland Functional Electrical Stimulation (FES) Center debuted.

=== 2000s ===
A continuation and extension of the Whitaker Development Award granted. The new BME Student Employment Program quadrupled co-op placements and doubled internship placements. 2002 – An $11.8 NIH award established the Center for Modeling Integrated Metabolic Systems. 2006 - Received a $4.5 million partnership award from the Wallace H. Coulter Foundation to for the Coulter-Case Translational Research Partnership (CCTRP) to support collaborative translational research projects among clinicians and biomedical engineering faculty to address unmet clinical needs and accelerate healthcare innovations from academia to market. The National Foundation for Cancer Research Center for Molecular Imaging at Case Western Reserve launched. 2008 – Received an anonymous $2 million gift to endow the CCTRP program directorship.

=== 2010 – present ===
In 2012 the Center for Computational Imaging and Personalized Diagnostics opened, with Anant Madabhushi, PhD as the director. In 2018 the department of biomedical engineering at the Cleveland Clinic was formally recognized as a department in the Case Western Reserve University School of Medicine.

=== Department Chairs ===
- Robert Kirsch – 2013 – present
- Jeffrey Duerk – 2008-2013
- P. Hunter Peckham – 2007–2008 (acting)
- Patrick Crago – 1999–2007
- Gerald Saidel – 1987–1999
- Peter Katona – 1980–1987
- Robert Plonsey – 1976–1980
- Peter Katona – 1974–1976 (acting)
- Leon Harmon – 1972–1974
- Harry Nara – 1970–1972 (acting)
- Donald Gann – 1968–1970
