= College of Arts and Sciences (Case Western Reserve University) =

College of Case Western Reserve University

Case Western Reserve University College of Arts and Sciences
- Established: 1826
- Dean: Lee A. Thompson (Interim Dean)
- Location: Cleveland, Ohio, U.S.
- Website: artsci.case.edu/

The College of Arts and Sciences of Case Western Reserve University in Cleveland, Ohio, is the oldest school of Case Western Reserve University. The school houses educational and research programs in the arts, humanities, social sciences, physical and biological sciences, and mathematical sciences. The college is organized into 21 academic departments and several interdisciplinary programs and centers. Students can choose a major or minor from almost 60 unique undergraduate programs, design their own courses of study, or enroll in integrated bachelor's/master's degree programs.

== History ==
The College of Arts and Sciences traces its origins to the founding of Western Reserve College in Hudson, Ohio in 1826, about 26 miles southwest of Cleveland. In 1882 Western Reserve College moved to Cleveland, where it united with a preexisting medical school and was renamed Western Reserve University. Constituent units of Western Reserve University included Adelbert College, Flora Stone Mather College for Women, and Cleveland College, all of which were brought together in 1972 under the original designation Western Reserve College, but this time constituting a subdivision of Case Western Reserve University. The College of Arts and Sciences as it exists today came about as the result of the 1992 unification of undergraduate and graduate programs with CWRU's research programs in the arts, humanities, social sciences, and physical sciences. Since 1992 the names "Western Reserve College" and "Western Reserve University" are no longer used.

== SAGES ==
SAGES is an acronym for Seminar Approach to General Education and Scholarship. Through a series of small interdisciplinary seminars students are connected with faculty, school culture, and the institutions of University Circle. The goal of the SAGES program is to help students acquire the knowledge and skills necessary to solve real world problems and to allow students to communicate their ideas effectively through writing and speech. All of Case Western Reserve University's colleges that grant undergraduate degrees participate in the SAGES program, which extends through the student's academic career. Traditionally, a student will spend the first two years of their college experience participating in a series of 3 interdisciplinary seminars. These interdisciplinary seminars are followed in the third year by a departmental seminar usually in the student's field of study. Finally, in the fourth year a student participates in a Capstone project which is designed to demonstrate the intellectually agility and collaborative spirit SAGES aims to foster in its students.

== Encyclopedia of Cleveland History ==
Encyclopedia of Cleveland History was printed in 1987 and 1996. Under the History department, the encyclopedia is maintained electronically.

== Deans ==
- 2004—2006 Mark Turner (cognitive scientist)
