= Robert Roskoski =

American academic

Robert Roskoski Jr.
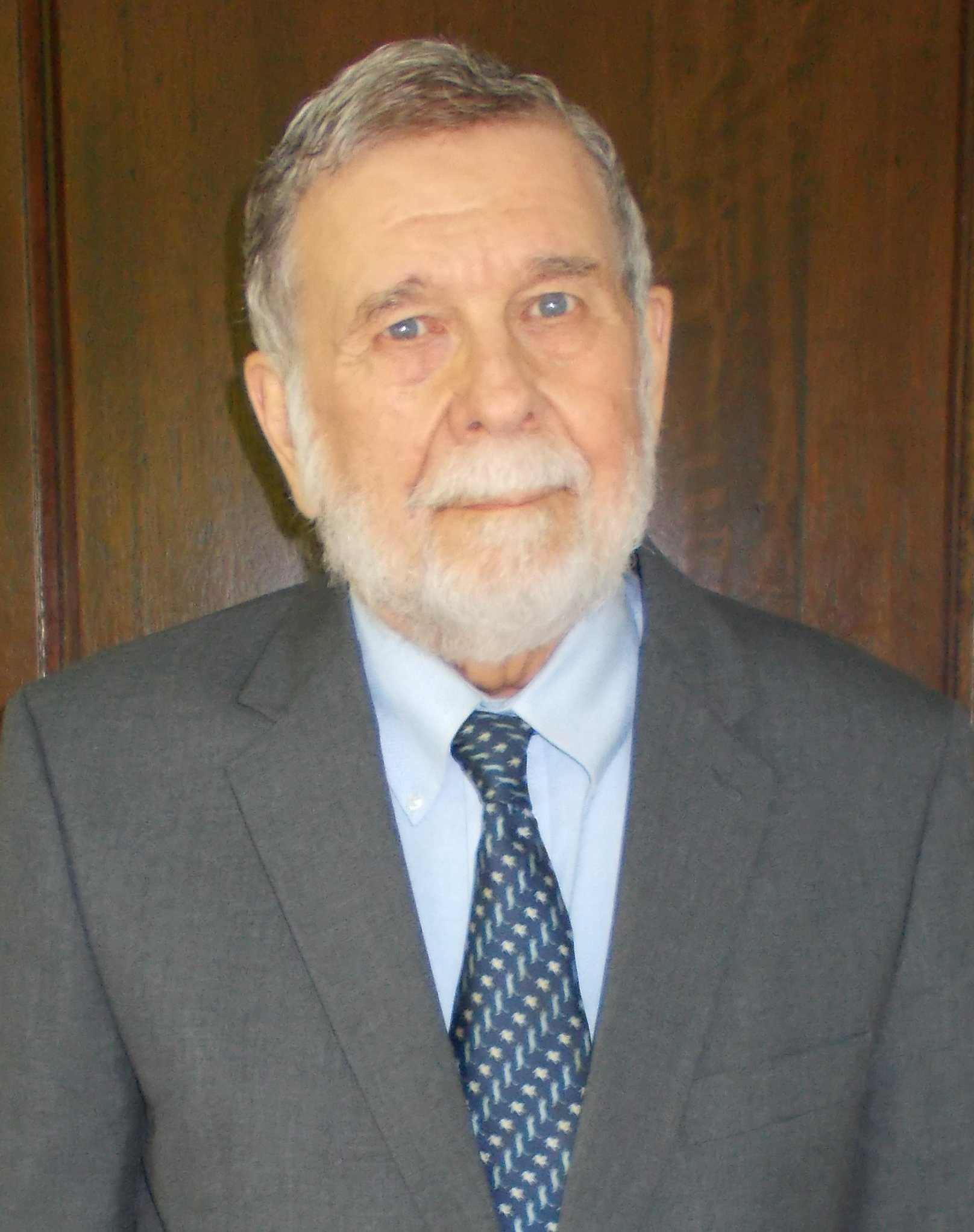
- Education: Bowling Green State University; University of Chicago; Rockefeller University
- Scientific career
- Workplaces: Blue Ridge Institute for Medical Research

Robert Roskoski Jr. is the Scientific Director and President of the Blue Ridge Institute for Medical Research.

== Education ==
Roskoski studied chemistry at Bowling Green State University, receiving a B.S. degree in 1961. He received an M.D. in 1964 and a Ph.D. in 1968 from the University of Chicago. His doctoral adviser was Donald F. Steiner, the discoverer of proinsulin. Roskoski was in the medical corps of the United States Air Force. Later, He became a Senior Investigator at the U.S. Air Force School of Aerospace Medicine at Brooks Air Force Base in San Antonio. He subsequently performed postdoctoral studies at the Rockefeller University under the tutelage of Fritz Lipmann from 1969 to 1972.

== Research and career ==
Robert Roskoski did research on the classification of small molecule protein kinase inhibitors that are used in the treatment of several cancers and he also developed the Gold Standard procedure for the measurement of Protein Kinase Enzyme Activity. His research interests include Protein kinase structure and function, Cancer chemotherapy, and Signal transduction.

He studied protein kinase structure and function and signal transduction. He also founded the Blue Ridge Institute for Medical Research in Horse Shoe, North Carolina in 2006. Research at the institute focuses on FDA-approved protein kinase inhibitors and monitoring extramural NIH grant support.

== Awards and honors ==
Robert Roskoski received the NIH Postdoctoral membership and NIH Special postdoctoral membership. From 1991 to 2006, he was the Fred G. Brazda Professor of Biochemistry at LSU Health Sciences Center in New Orleans.

American Chemical Society honors

== Publications ==
- Roskoski R Jr. (1983) Assays of protein kinase. Methods in Enzymology 99, 3–6.
- Roskoski R Jr. (2005) Src kinase regulation by phosphorylation and dephosphorylation. Biochem Biophys. Res. Commun. 331, 1–14.
- Roskoski R Jr. (2007) Vascular endothelial growth factor (VEGF) signalling in tumor progression. Crit. Rev. Oncol. Hematol. 62, 179–213.
- Roskoski R Jr. (2012) ERK1/2 MAP kinases: Structure, function, and regulation. Pharmacol. Res. 66, 105–143.
- Roskoski R Jr. (2014) The ErbB/HER family of protein-tyrosine kinases and cancer. Pharmacol. Res. 79, 34–74.
- Roskoski R Jr. A historical overview of protein kinases and their targeted small molecule inhibitors. Pharmacol Res 2015;100:1–23.
- Roskoski R Jr. (2016) Classification of small molecule inhibitors based upon the structures of their drug enzyme complexes. Pharmacol. Res. 103, 26–48.
