= Joy K. Ward =

Plant biologist

Joy K. Ward is an American plant biologist and academic administrator who serves as provost and executive vice president at Case Western Reserve University, where she is also a professor of biology. She previously served as dean of the university’s College of Arts and Sciences.

Ward’s research focuses on the effects of environmental change on plants and ecosystems, particularly plant responses to atmospheric carbon dioxide. She received the Presidential Early Career Award for Scientists and Engineers, awarded by U.S. President Barack Obama.

Prior to joining Case Western Reserve University, Ward was a faculty member at the University of Kansas, where she served as associate dean for research and Dean’s Professor in the College of Liberal Arts and Sciences. She became dean at Case Western Reserve in 2020 and was appointed provost and executive vice president effective January 1, 2024.

As provost, Ward has overseen academic initiatives related to interdisciplinary research, artificial intelligence in education, faculty recruitment, and undergraduate curriculum and advising.

== Education ==
Ward received her bachelor's degree in biology from Penn State University in 1991. She completed her master's degree in botany in 1994 at Duke. She then earned a PhD, also from Duke, in botany in 1997. Since 1997, Ward has published over 40 peer-reviewed articles.

== Research interests ==
Ward's primary research interests focus on how plants adapt to changing environments and conditions. As climate change has become an increasingly urgent issue worldwide, Ward has directed her research to understanding how specific species of plants react to changes in the atmospheric concentration of carbon dioxide. Ward approaches this question holistically, investigating molecular, physiological, and evolutionary changes. Notably, she uses fossil records in her research.

=== Carbon dioxide impacts ===
Ward has studied the impact of fluctuating carbon dioxide levels on plant adaptation in order to predict future changes. In 1999, Ward examined the differences in response between C_{3} and C_{4} plants when exposed to drought in environments that were low in carbon dioxide or high in carbon dioxide. Ward and her team found evidence that C_{4} plants have an advantage over C_{3} plants when atmospheric carbon dioxide levels increase. Additionally, the team found evidence that C_{4} plants have an advantage over C_{3} plants when they experience frequent and severe droughts. During this time, Ward also led research studies on the ways that increasing atmospheric carbon dioxide has affected plant species in the past and present. Ward has used her data to predict how plants and future ecosystems and biological processes will operate in the future where atmospheric carbon dioxide levels will become higher.

=== Carbon Dioxide Implications for the Future ===
Ward's research involves predictions about how increasing atmospheric carbon dioxide will impact plants, ecosystems, and ecology. In 2017, Ward led a study about plant responses to increasing carbon dioxide in the past, present, and future. Ward maintains that studying plants in this manner will allow scientists to better understand and predict the evolutionary consequences that will come with the changing environment. In this study, Ward found evidence for the implications of rising carbon dioxide for integrated plant-water dynamics and drought tolerance, the carbon dioxide effects on symbiotic interactions and evolutionary feedback, and the change in plant mechanisms in response to elevated carbon dioxide levels.

== Academic career ==
- 2024—present: Provost and Executive Vice President, Case Western Reserve University
- 2023—2024: Interim-Provost and Executive Vice President, Case Western Reserve University
- 2020—2023: Dean, College of Arts and Sciences, Case Western Reserve University
- 2015—2020: Dean's professor of the College of Liberal Arts and Sciences, University of Kansas
- 2015—2020: Professor with tenure, University of Kansas, Department of Ecology & Evolutionary Biology (courtesy appointment in environmental studies)
- 2009—2015: Associate professor with tenure, University of Kansas, Department of Ecology & Evolutionary Biology (courtesy appointment in environmental studies)
- 2006—2016: Inaugural Thelma and Edward Wohlgemuth Faculty Scholar Award. Endowed chair for early-career faculty, University of Kansas
- 2003—2009: Assistant professor, University of Kansas, Department of Ecology & Evolutionary Biology
- 1998—2003: Postdoctoral fellow, University of Utah, Department of Biology
- 1997—1998: Postdoctoral fellow, University of West Virginia and Duke University, Department(s) of Biology

*All positions have been uploaded from Ward's curriculum vitae

== Selected awards and honors ==
- 2020: Dean of the College of Arts and Sciences at Case Western Reserve University
- 2018: Graduate of the Food Systems Leadership Institute
- 2017: Elected to lead Scientific Research at the University of Kansas' College of Liberal Arts and Sciences
- 2016—2017: Women of Distinction Award, University of Kansas
- 2015: K. Barbara Schowen Undergraduate Research Mentor Award, University of Kansas
- 2015: Dean's Professor at the University of Kansas
- 2015: Arab-American Frontiers of Science, U.S. Chair for the 2015 Symposium (Saudi Arabia)
- 2014: Japanese-American Frontiers of Science, U.S. Chair for the 2014 Symposium (Japan)
- 2012—2013: Member of a U.S. delegation to Uzbekistan following a technology agreement through Hillary Clinton; sponsored by the American Association for the Advancement of Science (AAAS) and the U.S. State Department, Tashkent, Uzbekistan
- 2011—present: National Academy of Sciences, Frontiers of Science, U.S. chair "These symposia have become a major instrument in bringing together the best young researchers- the next generation of leaders- in the natural sciences and engineering fields, in the U.S. and around the world." National Academy of Sciences
- 2011: Named as a top scientist in Kansas history by the Ad Astra Initiative
- 2010: Member of the board of trustees for the University of Kansas Office of Research
- 2010—present: Kavli Fellow: Selected by the Kavli Board and the National Academy of Sciences
- 2009: Presidential Early Career Award for Scientists and Engineers (PECASE); Conferred personally by President Obama on January 13, 2010, in the White House "This is the highest honor bestowed by the United States government on outstanding scientists and engineers in the early stages of their independent research careers" White House press release
- 2009: Lawrence, KS Chamber of Commerce, KU Stars Award 2008—2015: National Science Foundation CAREER Award
- 2006—2015: Thelma and Edward Wohlgemuth Faculty Scholar Award
- 1998—1999: American Association of University Women (AAUW). American Post doctoral Fellowship
- 1997: Perry Prize for the Dissertation of Greatest Distinction. Duke University, Department of Botany
- 1997: Sigma Xi Travel Award, Duke University
- 1991:: Hammond Science Scholarship, Penn State University
- 1991: Amos William and Annie Martha Unger Memorial Scholarship, Penn State University
- 1988: Pennsylvania State Fair Queen scholarship- University tuition scholarship

*All awards and honors have been uploaded from Ward's curriculum vitae

== Select publications ==
- McLean BS, JK Ward, MJ Polito, SD Emslie. In press. Responses of alpine herbaceous plant assemblages to low glacial [CO_{2}] revealed by fossil marmot (Marmota) teeth. Oecologia
- Fuller BT, SM Fahrni, JM Harris, A Farrell, JB Coltrain, LM Gerhart, JK Ward, RE Taylor, JR Southon. In press. Ultrafiltration for asphalt removal from bone collagen for radiocarbon dating and isotopic analysis of Pleistocene fauna at the tar pits of Rancho La Brea. Quaternary Geochronology
- Voelker, S.L., R. Brooks, F.C. Meinzer, R. Andeson, M. K-F Bader, G. Battipaglia, K.M. Becklin, D. Beerling, D. Bert, J.L. Beltancourt, T.E. Dawson, J. -C Domec, R.P. Guyette, C. Koerner, S.W. Leavitt, S. Linder, J.D. Marshall, M. Mildner, I. Panyushkina, H.J. Plumpton, K.S. Pregitzer, M. Saurer, A.R Smith, R.T.W. Siegwolf, M.C. Stambaugh, A.F. Talhelm, J.C. Tardif, P.K. Van de Water, J.K. Ward, and L. Wingate. 2015. A dynamic leaf gas-exchange strategy is conserved in woody plats under changing [CO_{2}] enrichment studies. Global Change Biology 22(2): 889–902.
- Becklin KM, JS Medeiros, K Sale, *JK Ward. 2014. Evolutionary history underlies plant physiological responses to global change since the Last Glacial Maximum. Ecology Letters: 17: 691-699
- Basheer-salimia R, JK Ward. 2014. Climate change and its effects on olive tree physiology in Palestine. Review Of Research: 3: 1-7
- Medeiros JS, JK Ward. 2013. Increasing atmospheric [CO_{2}] from glacial to future concentrations affects drought tolerance via impacts on leaves, xylem and their integrated function. New Phytologist: 199: 738–748.
- Ward, J. K., D. S. Roy, I. Chatterjee, C. R. Bone, C. J. Springer, and J. K. Kelly. 2012. "Identification of a major QTL that alters flowering time at elevated [CO_{2}] in Arabidopsis thaliana" PLoS ONE. 7. e49028.
- Gerhart, L. M., J. M. Harris, J. B. Nippert, D. R. Sandquist, and J. K. Ward. 2012. "Glacial trees from the La Brea tar pits show physiological constraints of low CO_{2}" New Phytologist. 194. 63–69.
- Gerhart, L. M. and J. K. Ward. 2010. "Plant Responses to low [CO_{2}] of the past. Tansley Review" New Phytologist. 188. 674–695.
- Nippert, J. B., J. J. Butler, G. J. Kluitenberg, D. O. Whittemore, D. Arnold, S. E. Spal, and J. K. Ward. 2010. "Patterns of Tamarix water use during a record drought" Oecologia. 162. 283–292.
- Nippert, J. B., M. B. Hooten, D. R. Sandquist, and J. K. Ward. 2010. "A Bayesian model for predicting El Niño events using tree-ring widths and cellulose δ^{18}O" Journal of Geophysical Research: Biogeosciences. 115. G01011.
- Gonzalez-Meler, M. A., E. Blanc-Betes, C. E. Flower, J. K. Ward, and N. Gomez-Casanovas. 2009. "Plastic and adaptive responses of plant respiration to changes in atmospheric CO_{2} concentration" Physiologia Plantarum. 137. 473–484.
- Ward, J. K., D. A. Myers, and R. B. Thomas. 2008. "Physiological and growth responses of C_{3} and C_{4} plants to reduced temperature when grown at low CO_{2} of the last ice age" Journal of Integrative Plant Biology. 50. 1388–1395.
- Marchin RM, EL Sage, JK Ward. 2008. Population-level variation of Fraxinus americana L. (white ash) is influenced by precipitation differences across the native range. Tree Physiology 28: 151-159
- Springer CJ, JK Ward. 2007. Flowering time and elevated CO_{2}. Tansley Review. New Phytologist 176: 243-255
- Ward, J. K.. 2005. "Evolution and growth of plants in a low CO_{2} world" A History of Atmospheric CO_{2} and Its Effects on Plants, Animals, and Ecosystems. edited by Ehleringer, J. R., T. E. Cerling, and D. Dearing. 232–257.
- Ward, J. K., J. M. Harris, T. E. Cerling, A. Wiedenhoeft, M. J. Lott, M. Dearing, J. B. Coltrain, and J. R. Ehleringer. 2005. "Carbon starvation in glacial trees recovered from the La Brea tar pits" Proceedings of the National Academy of Sciences of the United States of America. 102. 690–694.
- Ward, J. K. and J. K. Kelly. 2004. "Scaling up evolutionary responses to elevated CO_{2}: lessons from Arabidopsis" Ecology Letters. 7. 427–440.
