= CWRU Film Society Science Fiction Marathon =

- Status: Active
- Genre: Film festival
- Frequency: Annually
- Location: Cleveland
- Inaugurated: 1976
- Website: films.case.edu/marathon.php

The CWRU Film Society Science Fiction Marathon, held by the CWRU Film Society at Case Western Reserve University (CWRU), is the longest-running 24-hour annual movie marathon event, attracting more than 100 customers annually. The Science Fiction Marathon is a weekend (approx. 36 hrs.) of back to back science fiction movies, trailers, and surprises. This event was started in 1976 and is attended by CWRU students, the Cleveland community, and people from out of state and from other countries. The Marathon takes place every spring semester starting the Friday after the first day of classes.

== Background ==
The CWRU Science Fiction Marathon was started by Charles Knox, a staff astronomer at CWRU. The inaugural event took place from January 18 through 24, 1976. That first year, 1,100 filmgoers watched 16 films in 28 hours with over 100 staying for all of the films. At any given marathon, they show a variety of films from a wide range of time periods with attention to never show too many films from any one decade and always being sure to include a new title as well as an older film.

In the early days of the marathon, multiple campus film societies collaborated to make an event so large able to happen, including the CWRU Film Society and the Case Interdorm, which focused mainly on on-campus residential events. The Marathon soon sparked Cleveland to have a variety of other local film series events including a Charlie Chaplin series at the Cedar Lee Theater, a new winter and spring series at Cleveland State University, and a Murder Mystery film series at the Mayfield Repertory Cinema. The event drew such a large crowd by its fourth year that WJW sent a camera crew to cover the opening of the marathon. It continued to be the headline movie event of the season with features including being the only theater in the city to run 70mm film. While the theater's ability to project in 70mm was later discontinued for over two decades, this feature was brought back in the 47th Science Fiction Marathon, with a showing of Howard the Duck. The theater continues to regularly show films in 70mm, and includes them in their yearly Marathon roster.

The event became a selling point in admissions and Cleveland attractions books and was listed as a longstanding tradition along with other major events such as the Hudson Relays.

== History ==
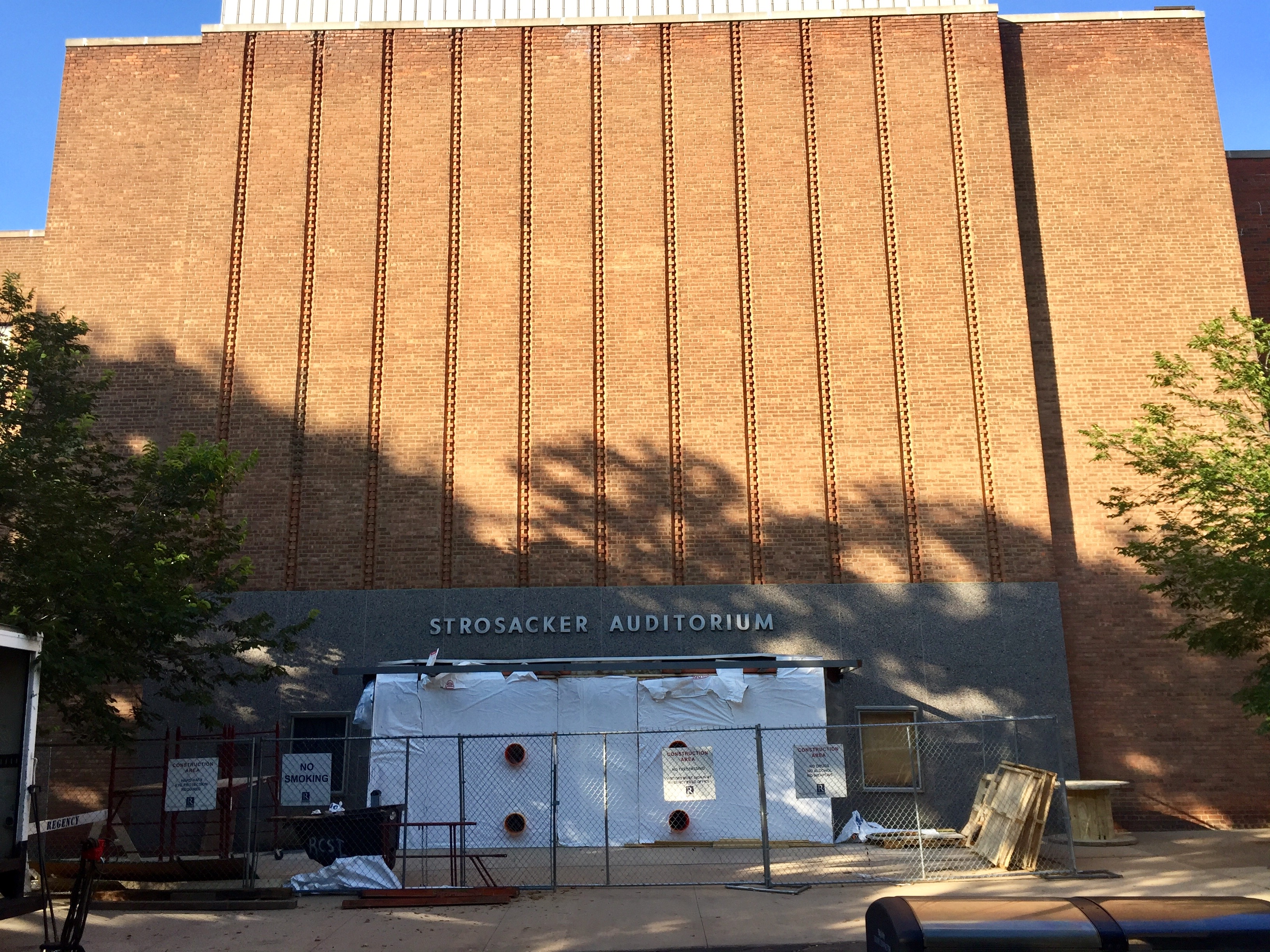
Strosacker Auditorium, the site of the event

The event was first held on January 30, 1976 in the Charles J. Strosacker Auditorium at Case Western Reserve University. Subsequent years have seen the event repeat annually with different titles and a variety of new and old films to cater to a wide variety of audiences.

In 2000, the Marathon celebrated its 25th anniversary. A local artist from Conneaut, Ohio by the name of KRASH so enjoyed attending the marathons that he created a mural with 24 sections. Each section was printed on a t-shirt and sold at the marathon. The complete mural was revealed for the 25th anniversary.

A complete list of movies shown at each event can be found on the CWRU Film Society website.

Marathon 46, which took place at the height of pandemic restrictions in 2021, was feature to several alternate solutions including a program to bring marathon into people's homes and a heavily modified process to admit attendees. Attendance ran up to its cap of 60 people and during the event, special announcements and changes included a memorial for Lyle Deavers, one of only six people who had attended every one of the marathons, built-in eating blocks for people to dine outdoors, the addition of posting a "where to stream" guide for home participants, and the announcement of an endowment that had been created for The CWRU Film Society, the parent group who hosts the annual event.

Marathon 47 featured the return of 70mm to the theater for the first time in over 25 years with a presentation of Howard the Duck as well as live accompaniment for the silent film The Golem.

A documentary is in progress showing the spectacle and evolution of the event over its long history by Frank Tarasco.

== See also ==
- Boston Film Festival
- Cleveland International Film Festival
- Toronto International Film Festival
- Boston Science Fiction Film Festival
