= Case Western Reserve University =

Private university in Cleveland, Ohio, US

- Former names: Western Reserve College (1826–1882); Western Reserve University (1882–1967); Case School of Applied Science (1880–1947); Case Institute of Technology (1947–1967)
- Motto: Historical: Christo et Ecclesiae (1827–1885); Lux (1885–1932)
- Motto in English: "For Christ and the Church" (1827–1885) "Light" (1885–1932)
- Type: Private research university
- Established: 1826; 200 years ago
- Accreditation: HLC
- Academic affiliations: AAU; AITU; URA; Space-grant
- Endowment: $2.52 billion (2025)
- President: Eric Kaler
- Provost: Joy K. Ward
- Faculty: 1,188 (fall 2025)
- Administrative staff: 3,248 (fall 2025)
- Students: 12,145 (fall 2026)
- Undergraduates: 6,590 (fall 2026)
- Postgraduates: 5,555 (fall 2026)
- Location: Cleveland, Ohio, United States; 41.504°N 81.608°W
- Campus: 267 acres (1.08 km^{2}); Large city
- Newspaper: The Case Western Reserve Observer
- Colors: CWRU Blue, white, and gray
- Nickname: Spartans
- Sporting affiliations: NCAA Division III – UAA; PAC (football)
- Mascot: Spartie
- Website: case.edu

Case Western Reserve University (CWRU) is a private research university in Cleveland, Ohio, United States. It was federated in 1967 by a merger between Western Reserve University, founded in 1826 by the Presbyterian Church, and the Case Institute of Technology, founded in 1880. In 2026, the university enrolled 12,145 students (6,590 undergraduates and 5,555 graduate and professional students) from all 50 U.S. states and 106 countries, and employed more than 1,188 full-time faculty members.

Case Western Reserve University comprises eight schools that offer more than 100 undergraduate programs and about 160 graduate and professional options across fields in STEM, medicine, arts, and the humanities. The university is a member of the Association of American Universities and is classified among "R1: Doctoral Universities – Very high research activity". According to the National Science Foundation, in 2023 the university had research and development (R&D) expenditures of $553.7 million, ranking it 18th among private institutions and 59th in the nation.

Case alumni, scientists, and scholars have played significant roles in many scientific breakthroughs and discoveries. Case professor Albert A. Michelson became the first American to win a Nobel Prize in science, receiving the Nobel Prize in Physics. In total, seventeen Nobel laureates are associated with Case Western Reserve University. The university's athletic teams, Case Western Reserve Spartans, play in NCAA Division III as a founding member of the University Athletic Association.

== History ==
=== Western Reserve College (1826–1882) and University (1882–1967) ===
Western Reserve College, the college of the Connecticut Western Reserve, was founded in 1826 in Hudson, Ohio, as the Western Reserve College and Preparatory School by the Presbyterian Church. Western Reserve College, or "Reserve" as it was popularly called, was the first college in northern Ohio. The school was called "Yale of the West"; its campus, now that of the Western Reserve Academy, imitated that of Yale. It had the same motto, "Lux et Veritas" (Light and Truth), the same entrance standards, and nearly the same curriculum. It was different from Yale in that it was a manual labor college, in which students were required to perform manual labor, seen as psychologically beneficial.

Western Reserve College's founders sought to instill in students an "evangelical ethos" and train Christian ministers for Ohio, where there was an acute shortage of them. The college was located in Hudson because the town made the largest financial offer to help in its construction. That town, about 30 miles (48 km) southeast of Cleveland, had been an antislavery center from the beginning: its founder, David Hudson, was against slavery, and founding trustee Owen Brown was a noted abolitionist who secured the location for the college. The abolitionist John Brown, who would lead the 1859 raid on Harpers Ferry, grew up in Hudson and was the son of co-founder Owen Brown. Hudson was a major stop on the Underground Railroad.

With Presbyterian influences of its founding, the school's origins were strongly though briefly associated with the pre-Civil War abolitionist movement; the abolition of slavery was the dominant topic on campus in 1831. The trustees were unhappy with the situation. The college's chaplain and Bible professor, Beriah Green, gave four sermons on the topic and then resigned, expecting that he would be fired. President Charles Backus Storrs took a leave of absence for health, and soon died. One of the two remaining professors, Elizur Wright, soon left to head the American Anti-Slavery Society.

Western Reserve was the first college west of the Appalachian Mountains to enroll (1832) and graduate (1836) an African-American student, John Sykes Fayette. Frederick Douglass gave the commencement speech in 1854.

In 1838, the Loomis Observatory was built by astronomer Elias Loomis, and today remains the second oldest observatory in the United States, and the oldest still in its original location.

In 1852, the Medical School became the second medical school in the United States to graduate a woman, Nancy Talbot Clark. Five more women graduated over the next four years, including Emily Blackwell and Marie Zakrzewska, giving Western Reserve the distinction of graduating six of the first eight female physicians in the United States.

By 1875, Cleveland had emerged as the dominant population and business center of the region, and the city wanted a prominent higher education institution. In 1882, with funding from Amasa Stone, Western Reserve College moved to Cleveland and changed its name to Adelbert College of Western Reserve University. Adelbert was the name of Stone's son.

=== Case School of Applied Science (1880–1947) and Institute of Technology (1947–1967) ===
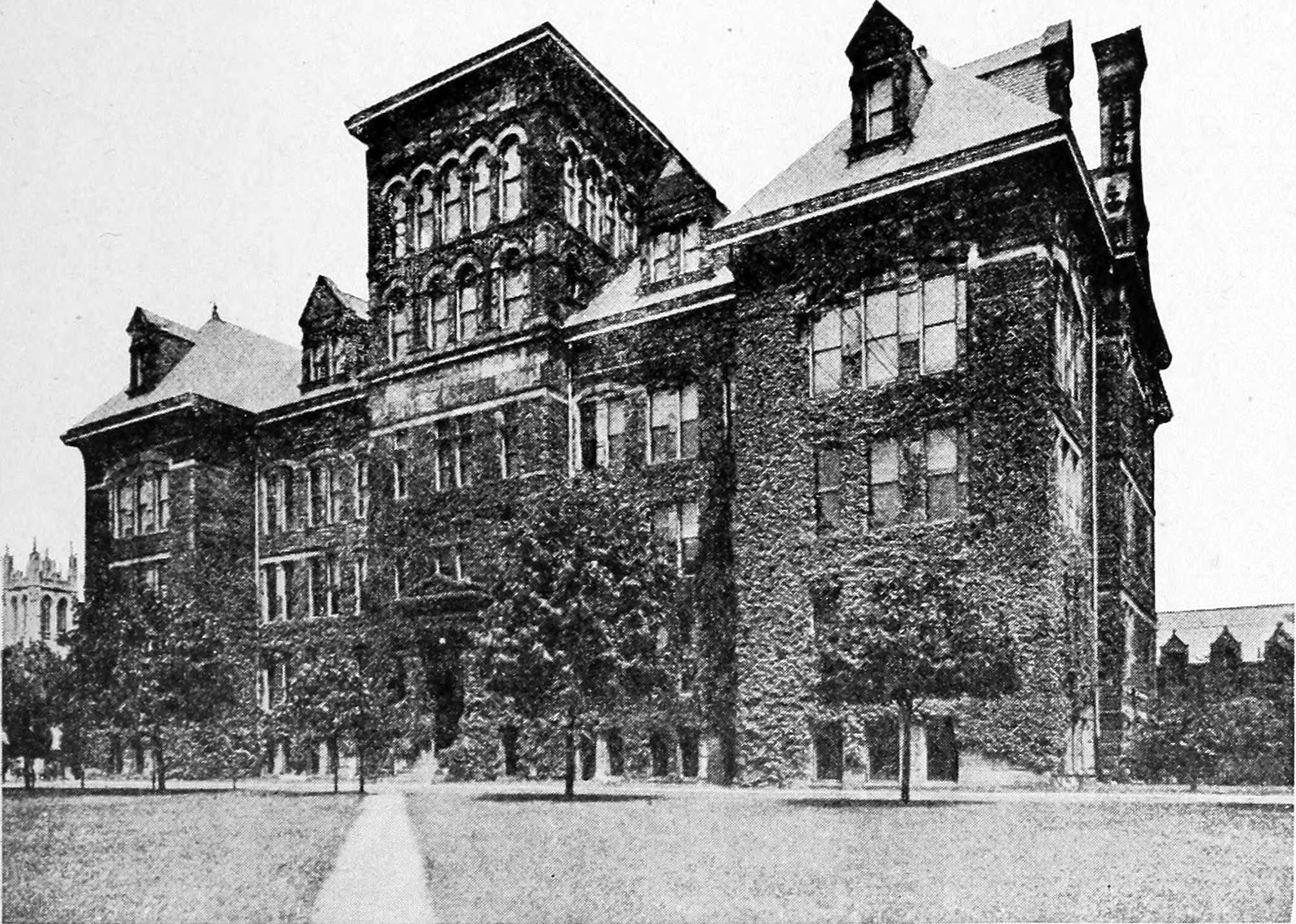
The main building of the Case School of Applied Science in 1916

In 1877, Leonard Case Jr. began laying the groundwork for the Case School of Applied Science by secretly donating valuable pieces of Cleveland real estate to a trust. He asked his confidential advisor, Henry Gilbert Abbey, to administer the trust and to keep it secret until after his death in 1880.

On March 29, 1880, articles of incorporation were filed for the founding of the Case School of Applied Science. Classes began on September 15, 1881. The school received its charter by the state of Ohio in 1882.

For the first four years of the school's existence, it was located in the Case family's home on Rockwell Street in downtown Cleveland. Classes were held in the family house, while the chemistry and physics laboratories were on the second floor of the barn. Amasa Stone's gift to relocate Western Reserve College to Cleveland also included a provision for the purchase of land in the University Circle area, adjacent to Western Reserve University, for the Case School of Applied Science. The school relocated to University Circle in 1885.

In 1921 Albert Einstein came to the Case campus during his first visit to the United States, out of respect for the physics work performed there. Besides noting the research done in the Michelson–Morley experiment, Einstein also met with physics professor Dayton Miller to discuss his own research.

During World War II, Case School of Applied Science was one of 131 colleges and universities nationally that took part in the V-12 Navy College Training Program which offered students a path to a Navy commission.

Over time, the Case School of Applied Science expanded to encompass broader subjects, adopting the name Case Institute of Technology in 1947 to reflect the institution's growth.

Led by polymer expert Eric Baer in 1963, the nation's first stand-alone Polymer Science and Engineering program was founded, to eventually become the Department of Macromolecular Science and Engineering.

=== Federation of two universities ===
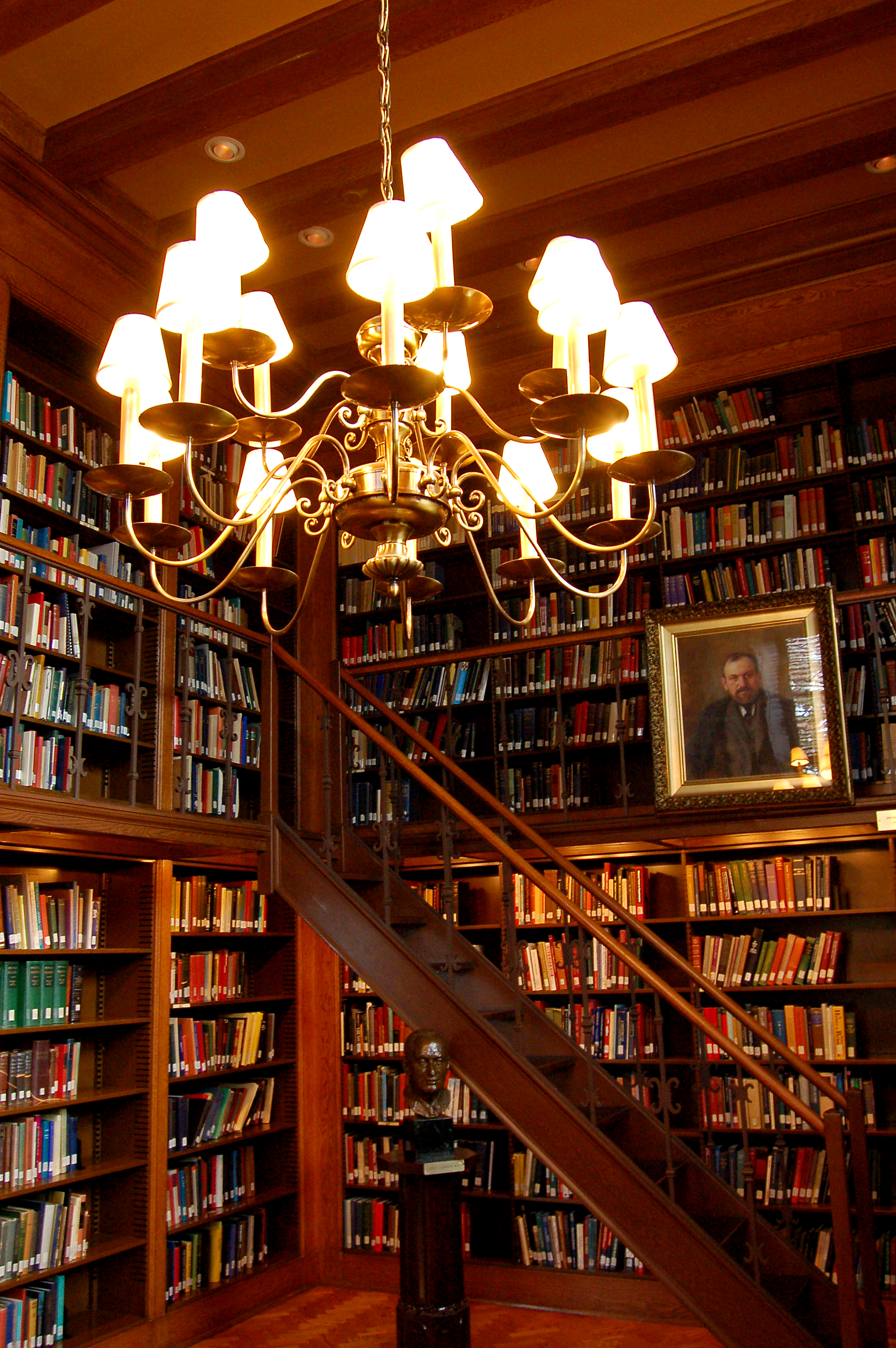
Reading room at Allen Memorial Medical Library of Case Western Reserve University

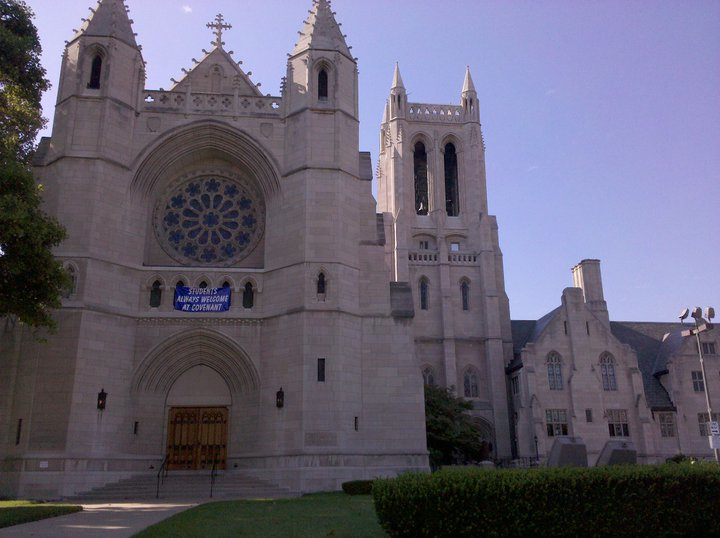
Presbyterian Church of the Covenant on the campus of Case Western Reserve University

Although the trustees of Case Institute of Technology and Western Reserve University did not formally federate their institutions until 1967, the institutions already shared buildings and staff when necessary and worked together often. One such example was seen in 1887, when Case physicist Albert Michelson and Reserve chemist Edward Morley collaborated on the famous Michelson–Morley experiment.

There had been some discussion of a merger of the two institutions as early as 1890, but those talks dissolved quickly. In the 1920s, the Survey Commission on Higher Education in Cleveland took a strong stand in favor of federation and the community was behind the idea as well, but in the end all that came of the study was a decision by the two institutions to cooperate in founding Cleveland College, a special unit for part-time and adult students in downtown Cleveland.

By the 1960s, Reserve President John Schoff Millis and Case President T. Keith Glennan shared the idea that federation would create a complete university, one better able to attain national distinction. Financed by the Carnegie Corporation, Cleveland Foundation, Greater Cleveland Associated Foundation, and several local donors, a study commission of national leaders in higher education and public policy was charged with exploring the idea of federation. The Heald Commission, so known for its chair, former Ford Foundation President Henry T. Heald, predicted in its final report that a federation could create one of the largest private universities in the nation.

=== Case Western Reserve University (1967–present) ===
In 1967, Case Institute of Technology, a school with its emphasis on engineering and science, and Western Reserve University, a school with professional programs and liberal arts, came together to form Case Western Reserve University.

In 1968, the Department of Biomedical Engineering launched as a newly unified collaboration between the School of Engineering and School of Medicine as the first in the nation and as one of the first Biomedical Engineering programs in the world. The following year in 1969, the first Biomedical Engineering MD/PhD program in the world began at Case Western Reserve.

The first computer engineering degree program in the United States was established in 1971 at Case Western Reserve.

The controversial "Case" logo

On August 18, 2003, the university unveiled a new logo and branding campaign that emphasized the "Case" portion of its name. The decision to put emphasis on the "Case" portion of the name was motivated by issues related to name recognition of the existing CWRU acronym, especially outside of northeast Ohio. In 2006, interim university president Gregory Eastwood convened a task group to study reactions to the campaign. The panel's report indicated that it had gone so poorly that, "There appear to be serious concerns now about the university's ability to recruit and maintain high-quality faculty, fund-raising and leadership." Also, the logo was derided among the university's community and alumni and throughout northeastern Ohio; critics said it looked like "...a fat man with a surfboard."

On May 9, 2003, the 2003 Case Western Reserve University shooting occurred when Biswanath Halder entered the Peter B. Lewis Building of the Weatherhead School of Management where he killed graduate student Norman Wallace and wounded two professors. Halder took people in the building hostage, and they ran, barricaded themselves in, and hid as the gunman roamed the building, shooting indiscriminately. Halder was finally apprehended by a SWAT team after seven hours. Halder was convicted on multiple felony counts and sentenced to life in prison; he lost a 2008 appeal.

In March 2007, the Branding Task Group presented its recommendations; a key recommendation was to return a graphic identity that gave equal weight to both the "Case" and "Western Reserve" names. As part of this, the creation of a new logo and wordmark was also recommended, with an implementation group to work with various stakeholders to develop a replacement logo and wordmark. At a June 2nd meeting, the university's board of trustees approved a shift back to giving equal weight to "Case" and "Western Reserve". In an open letter to the university community, interim president Eastwood admitted that "the university had misplaced its own history and traditions" with the 2003 branding changes. Implementation of the new logo began July 1, 2007. The replacement logo, informally known as the "sunburst", would last until 2023. The "Forward Thinking" campaign was launched in 2011 by President Barbara Snyder and raised $1 billion in 30 months. The board of trustees unanimously agreed to expand the campaign to $1.5 billion, which reached its mark in 2017. The campaign ultimately raised $1.82 billion.

A 2020 United States presidential debate, the first of two, was held at the Samson Pavilion of the Health Education Campus (HEC), shared by the Cleveland Clinic.

In February 2020, president Barbara Snyder was appointed the president of Association of American Universities (AAU). Later that year, former Tulane University president Scott Cowen was appointed interim president. On October 29, 2020, Eric W. Kaler, former University of Minnesota president, was appointed as the new Case Western Reserve University president, effective July 1, 2021.

On 2 June 2023, the 16 year old "sunburst" logo was replaced by a new logo which retained the sun element, but presented a more simple design, new fonts and brighter colors. The new logo was met with mixed feelings from students, some praising the font choice and colors. Others disliked the removal of the university's establishment year, 1826, present on the 2007-2023 logo, and the redesign of the sun image. The editorial board of Case Western Reserve's student paper, The Observer, expressed overall dissatisfaction with the new logo, describing it as "bland" and "an embarrassment and stains the reputation of success that built our historic institution." Concerns were also expressed about the frequency of logo changes, as this was the third logo in 23 years. Such frequent changes could harm the university's image and brand consistency and lead to a repeat of the 2003 logo situation reoccurring.

=== Presidents ===
No.	President	From	To
1	Robert W. Morse	1967	1970
2	Louis A. Toepfer	1970	1980
3	David V. Ragone	1980	1987
4	Agnar Pytte	1987	1999
5	David H. Auston	1999	2001
6	James W. Wagner (interim)	2001	2002
7	Edward M. Hundert	2002	2006
8	Gregory L. Eastwood (interim)	2006	2007
9	Barbara R. Snyder	2007	2020
10	Scott S. Cowen (interim)	2020	2021
11	Eric W. Kaler	2021	present

== Campus ==
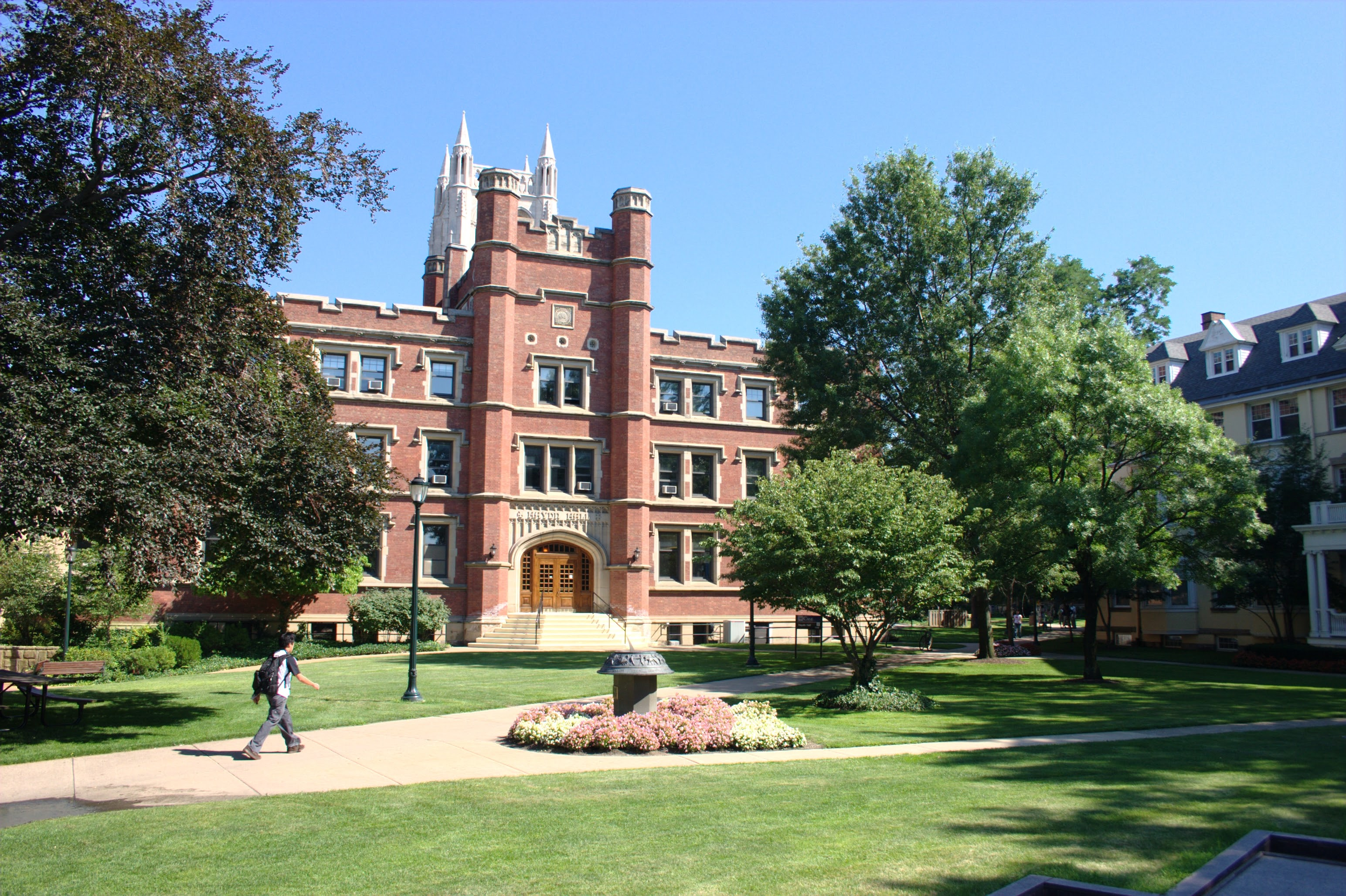
Haydn Hall on the Flora Stone Mather Quadrangle, built in 1901

Case Western Reserve University's main campus is approximately 5 miles (8 km) east of Downtown Cleveland in the neighborhood known as University Circle, an area containing many educational, medical, and cultural institutions.

=== Case Quad ===
The Case Quadrangle, known also to students as the Engineering Quad, contains most engineering and science buildings, notably the John D. Rockefeller Physics Building. The Case Quad also houses administration buildings, including Adelbert Hall. The Michelson–Morley experiment occurred here, commemorated by a marker and the Michelson-Morley Memorial Fountain. The southernmost edge consists of athletic areas—Adelbert Gymnasium, Van Horn Field and the Veale Convocation, Recreation and Athletic Center (commonly referred to as the Veale Center). The Veale Center houses the Horsburgh Gymnasium and the Veale Natatorium.

=== Mather Quad ===
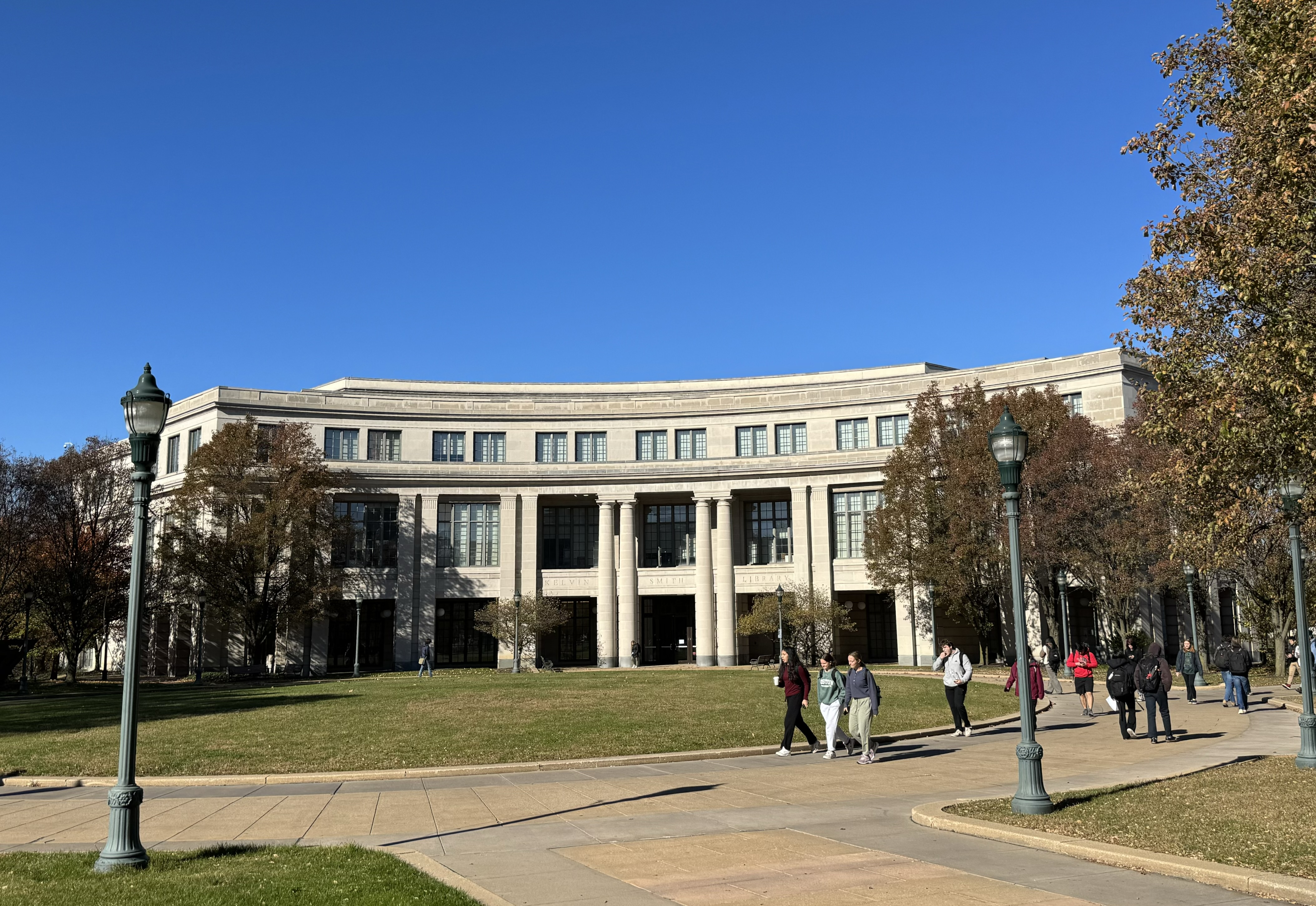
Kelvin Smith Library is the main library of Case Western Reserve.

The Flora Stone Mather Quadrangle is located north of Euclid Avenue between East Blvd., East 115th Street, and Juniper Road. The Flora Stone Mather College Historic District is more strictly defined by the area between East Blvd, Bellflower Road, and Ford Road north of Euclid Avenue. Named for the philanthropist wife of prominent industrialist Samuel Livingston Mather II and sister-in-law of the famous statesman John Hay, the Mather Quad is home to Weatherhead School of Management, School of Law, Mandel School of Applied Social Sciences, and many departments of the College of Arts and Sciences.

=== Transportation ===
On and near campus, CircleLink is a free public shuttle service in University Circle and Little Italy. For city public transit, rail and bus access are managed by the Greater Cleveland Regional Transit Authority (RTA). The two Red Line rapid train stations are Little Italy–University Circle and Cedar–University. Notably, the Red Line connects campus to Cleveland Hopkins Airport and Downtown Cleveland. The bus rapid transit (BRT) HealthLine runs down the center of campus along Euclid Ave. Numerous RTA bus routes run through campus.

== Academics ==
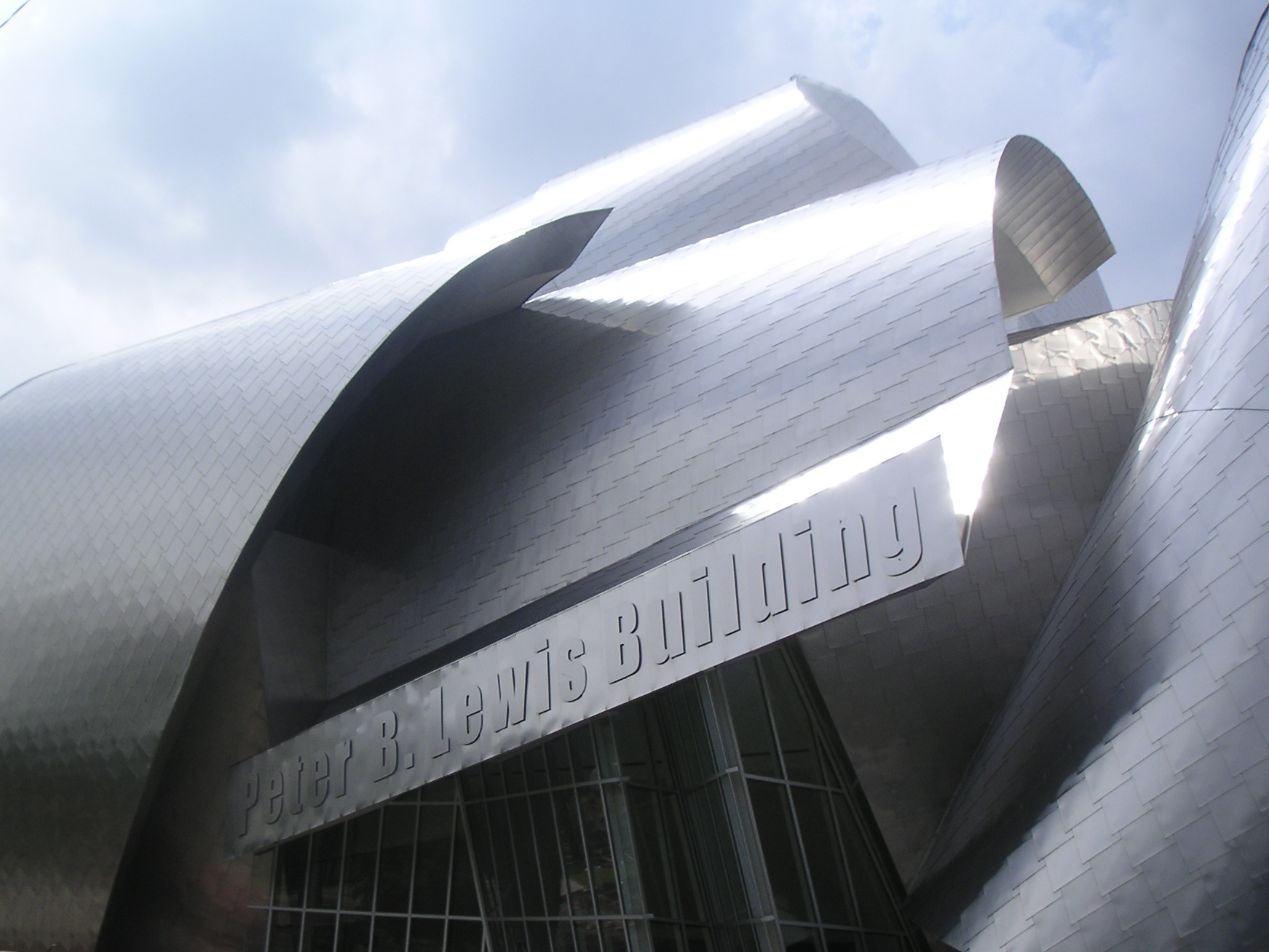
The Peter B. Lewis Building, designed by Frank Gehry, houses the Weatherhead School of Management.

The university in its present form consists of eight schools that offer more than 100 undergraduate programs and about 160 graduate and professional options.

- College of Arts and Sciences (1826)
- Case School of Dental Medicine (1892)
- Case School of Engineering (1880)
- School of Law (1892)
- Weatherhead School of Management (1952)
- School of Medicine
  - University Program (1843)
  - Cleveland Clinic Lerner College of Medicine (College Program) (2002)
- Frances Payne Bolton School of Nursing (1898)
- Mandel School of Applied Social Sciences (1915)

CWRU also supports over 100 interdisciplinary academic and research centers in various fields. Its graduate medical education includes residency and fellowship programs at University Hospitals Cleveland Medical Center (also known as University Hospitals Case Medical Center) and The MetroHealth System.

=== Undergraduate profile ===
Undergraduate admissions statistics
- 2023 entering class
- Admit rate: 28.7% ( −0.6)
- Yield rate: 13.8% (▼ −4.1)

Test scores middle 50%^{[i]}
- SAT Total: 1440–1530 (among 43% of FTFs)
- ACT Composite: 32–35 (among 23% of FTFs)

High school GPA
- Average: 3.8

The undergraduate student body hails from all 50 states and over 90 countries.

The six most popular majors are biomedical engineering, biology/biological sciences, nursing, mechanical engineering, and psychology. Since 2016, the top fields for graduating CWRU undergraduate students have been engineering, nursing, research and science, accounting and financial services, and information technology.

In 2023, the university received 39,039 applications. It extended offers of admission to 11,193 applicants, or 28.7%. 73% of admitted students were from outside Ohio and 13% from outside the United States. 1,544 accepted students chose to enroll, a yield rate of 13.8%.

Of the 43% of incoming students in 2023 who submitted SAT scores, the total interquartile range was 1440–1530; of the 23% of incoming students in 2023 who submitted ACT scores, the interquartile range of composite scores was 32–35. Of all matriculating students, the average high school GPA was 3.8. 71% of admitted students graduated in the top 10% of their high school class.

=== Rankings ===
Academic rankings

National
- Forbes: 131
- U.S. News & World Report: 44
- Washington Monthly: 148
- WSJ/College Pulse: 238

Global
- ARWU: 151–200
- QS: 294 (tie)
- THE: 145
- U.S. News & World Report: 176 (tie)

In the 2026 Time Magazine and Statista World's Top Universities based on academic capacity and performance, innovation and economic impact, and world engagement, Case Western Reserve was ranked #27 (originally #25, but revised).

In U.S. News & World Report's 2027 rankings, Case Western Reserve was ranked 44th among national universities and 160th among global universities. The 2020 edition of The Wall Street Journal/Times Higher Education (WSJ/THE) rankings ranked Case Western Reserve as 52nd among US colleges and universities.

In 2018, Case Western Reserve was ranked 37th in the category American "national universities" and 146th in the category "global universities" by U.S. News & World Report. In 2019 U.S. News ranked it tied for 42nd and 152nd, respectively. Case Western Reserve was also ranked 32nd among U.S. universities—and 29th among private institutions—in the inaugural 2016 edition of The Wall Street Journal/Times Higher Education (WSJ/THE) rankings, but ranked tied for 39th among U.S. universities in 2019.

Case Western Reserve University's biochemistry program is jointly administered with the CWRU School of Medicine, and was ranked 14th nationally in the latest rankings by Blue Ridge Institute for Medical Research.

Case Western Reserve is noted (among other fields) for research in electrochemistry and electrochemical engineering. The Michelson–Morley interferometer experiment was conducted in 1887 in the basement of a campus dormitory by Albert A. Michelson of Case School of Applied Science and Edward W. Morley of Western Reserve University. Michelson became the first American to win a Nobel Prize in science.

Also in 2018, The Hollywood Reporter ranked CWRU's Department of Theater Master of Fine Arts program with the Cleveland Play House as 18th in the English-speaking world. In 2019, this ranking improved to 12th.

In 2014, Washington Monthly ranked Case Western Reserve University as the 9th best National University, but in the 2018 rankings, Case Western Reserve was ranked the 118th best National University.

In 2013, Washington Monthly ranked Case Western Reserve as the nation's 4th best National University for contributing to the public good. The publication's ranking was based upon a combination of factors including social mobility, research, and service. In 2009, the school had ranked 15th. Although Washington Monthly no longer ranks contributions to the public good as such, in its 2018 rankings of National Universities Case Western Reserve was ranked 180th in Social mobility and 118th in Service.

In 2013, Case Western Reserve was among the Top 25 LGBT-Friendly Colleges and Universities, according to Campus Pride. The recognition follows Case Western Reserve's first five-star ranking on the Campus Pride Index, a detailed survey of universities' policies, services and institutional support for LGBT individuals.

Case Western Reserve ranks 13th among private institutions (26th among all) in federal expenditures for science and engineering research and development, per the National Science Foundation.

== Research ==
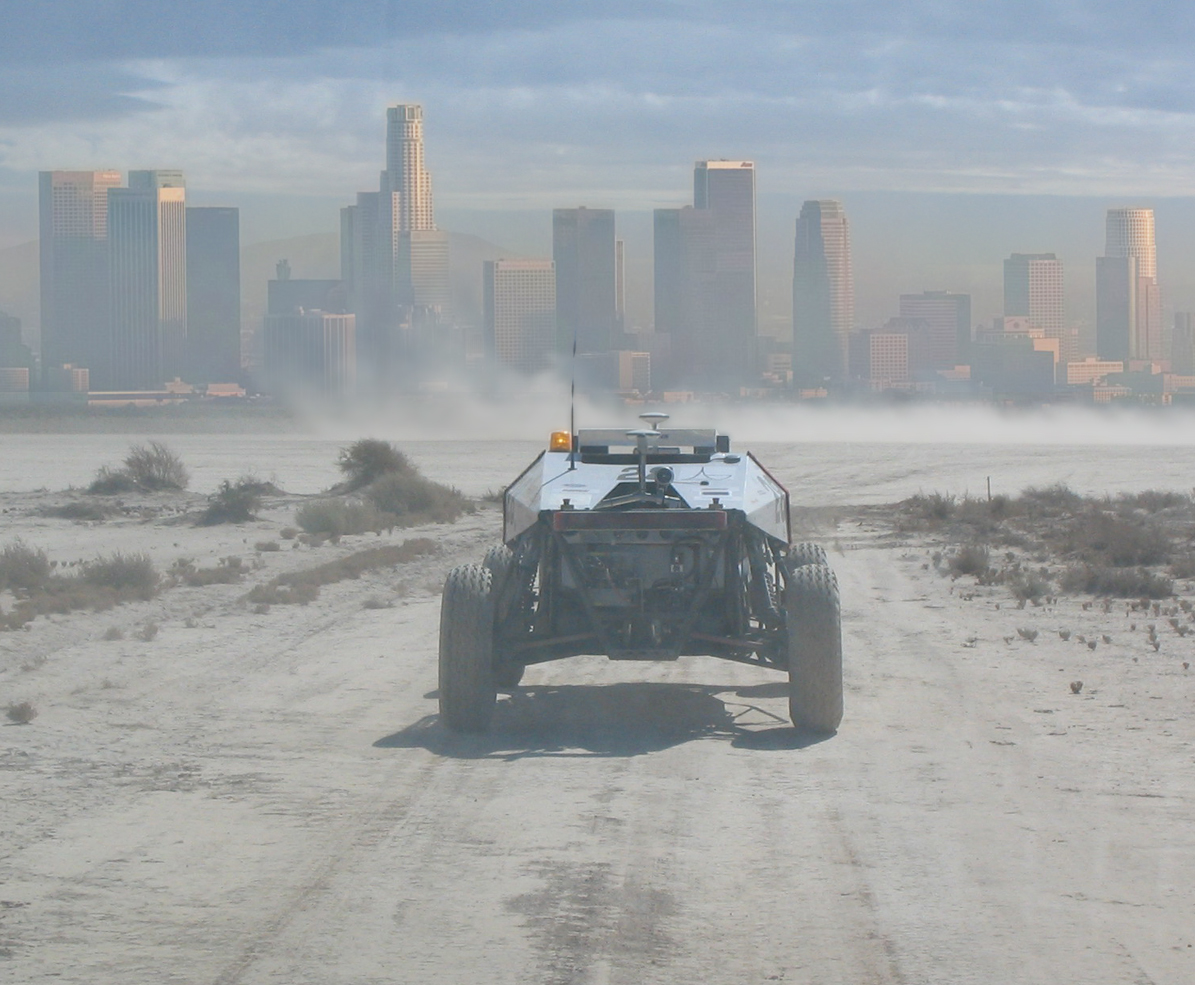
DEXTER, Team Case's autonomous car, in DARPA Grand Challenge 2007

Case Western Reserve University is a member of the Association of American Universities and is classified among "R1: Doctoral Universities – Very high research activity". Following is a partial list of major contributions made by faculty, staff, and students at Case Western Reserve since 1887:

- Case Western Reserve was the site of the Michelson-Morley interferometer experiment, conducted in 1887 by Albert A. Michelson of Case Institute of Technology and Edward W. Morley of Western Reserve University. This experiment proved the non-existence of the ether, and provided evidence that later substantiated Einstein's special theory of relativity
- Albert A. Michelson, who became the first American to win a Nobel Prize in science, taught at Case Institute of Technology. He won the prize in physics in 1907.
- Edward W. Morley, in 1895, made the most precise (to that date) determination of the atomic weight of oxygen, the basis for calculating the weights of all other elements.
- Dayton C. Miller, in 1896, performed the first full X-ray of the human body—on himself.
- George W. Crile, in 1905, performed the first modern blood transfusion, using a coupling device to connect blood vessels.
- Roger G. Perkins, in 1911, pioneered drinking water chlorination to eradicate typhoid bacilli.
- Claude S. Beck, in 1935, pioneered surgical treatment of coronary artery disease.
- Robert Kearns, in 1964, invented the intermittent windshield wiper used in most modern automobiles.
- Frederick Reines, in 1965, first detected neutrinos created by cosmic ray collisions with the Earth's atmosphere and developed innovative particle detectors. Case Western Reserve had selected Reines as chair of the physics department based on Reines's work that first detected neutrinos emitted from a nuclear reactor—work for which Reines shared a 1995 Nobel Prize.
- Eric Baer, in 1967, pioneered the materials science of polymers and created the first comprehensive polymer science and engineering department at a major U.S. university.
- In 1987 the first edition of the Encyclopedia of Cleveland History was published.
- Roger Quinn, in 2001, developed robots such as Whegs that mimic cockroaches and other crawling insects Case Biorobotics Lab
- Tshilidzi Marwala, in 2006, began work on Local Loop Unbundling in Africa. He also chaired the Local Loop Unbundling Committee on behalf of the South African Government. Furthermore, Marwala and his collaborators developed an artificial larynx, developed the theory of rational counterfactuals, computer bluffing as well as establishing the relationship between artificial intelligence and the theory of information asymmetry.
- In 2007, a team from Case Western Reserve participated in the DARPA Urban Challenge with a robotic car named DEXTER. Team Case placed as one of 36 semi-finalists.
- Case Western Reserve University researchers are developing atomically thin drumheads which is tens of trillions times smaller in volume and 100,000 times thinner than the human eardrum. They will be made with the intent to receive and transmit signals across a radio frequency range which will be far greater than what we can hear with the human ear.
- Simon Ostrach and Yasuhiro Kamotani led spacelab projects entitled surface tension driven convection experiment (STDCE) aboard the Space Shuttle STS-50 and the re-flight STDCE-2 in USML-2 aboard STS-73 studying oscillatory thermocapillary flows in the absence of gravitational effects.
- James T'ien has contributed to the study of numerous microgravity combustion space flight experiments including the Candle Flame In Non-Buoyant Atmospheres aboard the Space Shuttle STS-50 along with the reflight to Mir Orbiting Station in 1995, the Burning and Suppression of Solids (BASS) taking place aboard the International Space Station along with the experiment reflight (BASS-2). He received the NASA Public Service Medal in 2000. He is a member of the National Academy of Sciences and serves on the Committee of Biological and Physical Sciences in Space.

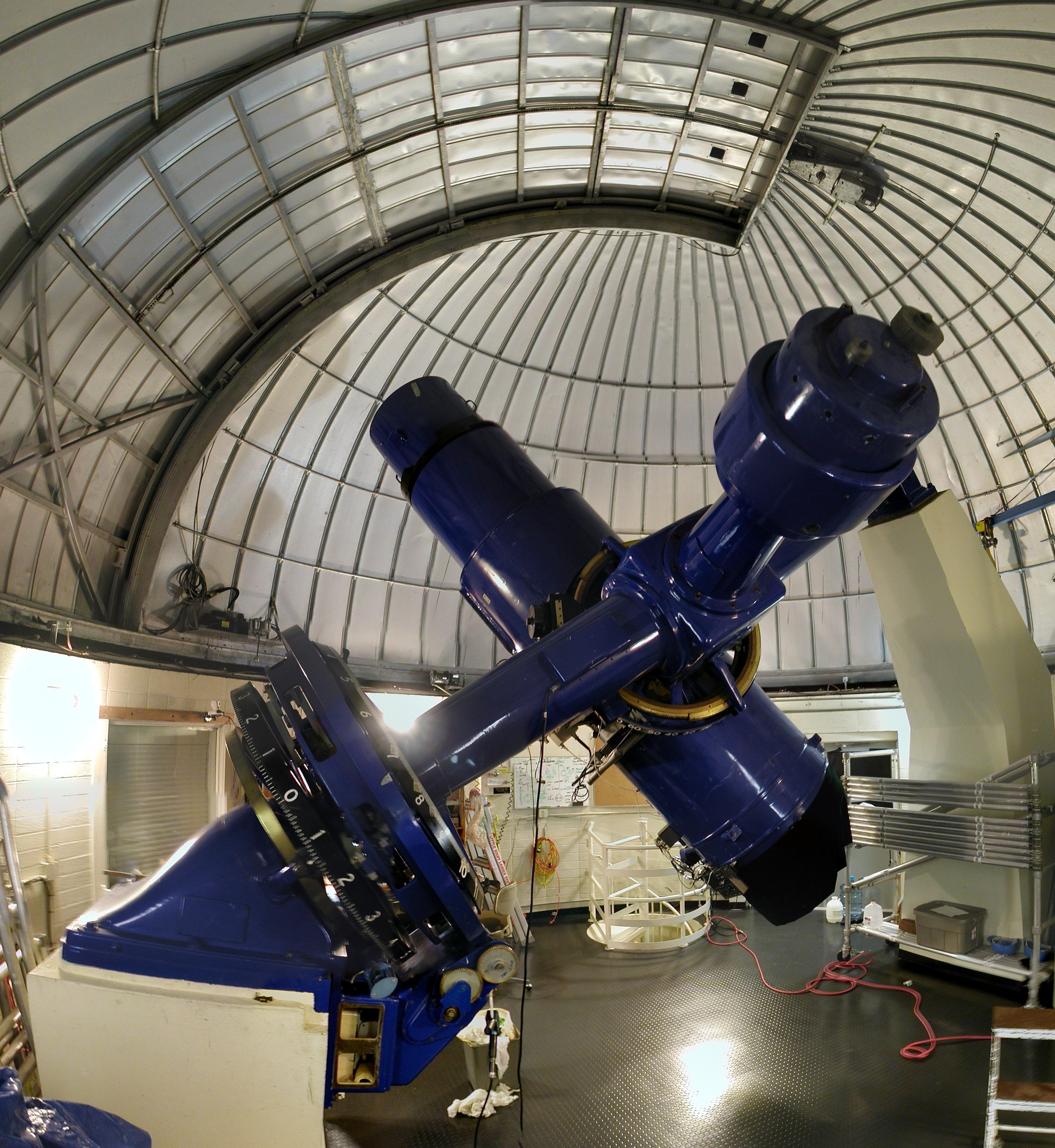
The Burrell Schmidt telescope at the Warner and Swasey Observatory at Kitt Peak National Observatory in Arizona

Today, the university operates several facilities off campus for scientific research. One example of this is the Warner and Swasey Observatory at Kitt Peak National Observatory in Arizona.

=== Electrochemistry ===
CWRU has contributed to the electrochemical sciences since the 1930s beginning with Frank Hovorka's studies of quinhydrone (quinone) and other electrodes. Subsequently, Ernest Yeager carried out pioneering studies on ultrasound electrodeposition and oxygen reduction reaction (ORR), which is directly relevant for H2-O2 fuel cells and batteries that use air electrodes such as zinc-air, iron-air, etc. The Yeager Center for Electrochemical Sciences (YCES), formerly the Case Center for Electrochemical Sciences, has provided annual workshops on electrochemical measurements since the late 1970s. The leadership in the Electrochemical Society have frequently included CWRU professors, and the university is home to six Fellows of the Electrochemical Society. Some notable achievements involve the work on ultrasound electrochemistry, oxygen reduction fundamentals, boron-doped diamond electrodes, in-situ electrochemical spectroscopy, polybenzimidazole (PBI) membranes for high-temperature fuel cells (HT-PEM), methanol fuel cells, iron-based flow batteries, metal deposition studies, dendrite modeling and electrochemical sensors. Noted laboratories at Case include the Electrochemical Engineering and Energy Laboratory (EEEL), the Electrochemical Materials Fabrication Laboratory (EMFL), the Case Electrochemical Capacitor Fabrication Facility and the ENERGY LAB.

=== Sears think[box] ===
Larry Sears and Sally Zlotnick Sears think[box] is a public-access design and innovation center at Case Western Reserve University that allows students and other users to access prototyping equipment and other invention resources. The makerspace is located in the Richey Mixon building, a seven-story, 50,000 sq. ft. facility behind the campus athletic center. Over $35 million has been invested in space including in large part from a funding of $10 million from alumni Larry Sears and his wife Sally Zlotnick Sears. Larry Sears is an adjunct faculty member in the Department of Electrical Computer and Systems Engineering at CWRU and the founder of Hexagram, Inc. (now ACLARA Wireless Technologies). Many projects and startup companies have come out of the makerspace. The Sears think[box] also hosts many of the university's student design teams.

=== Computing ===
Case Western Reserve had the first ABET-accredited program in computer engineering.

In 1968, the university formed a private company, Chi Corporation, to provide computer time to both it and other customers. Initially this was on a Univac 1108 (replacing the preceding UNIVAC 1107), 36 bit, ones' complement machine. The company was sold in 1977 to Robert G. Benson in Beachwood, Ohio becoming Ecocenters Corporation.

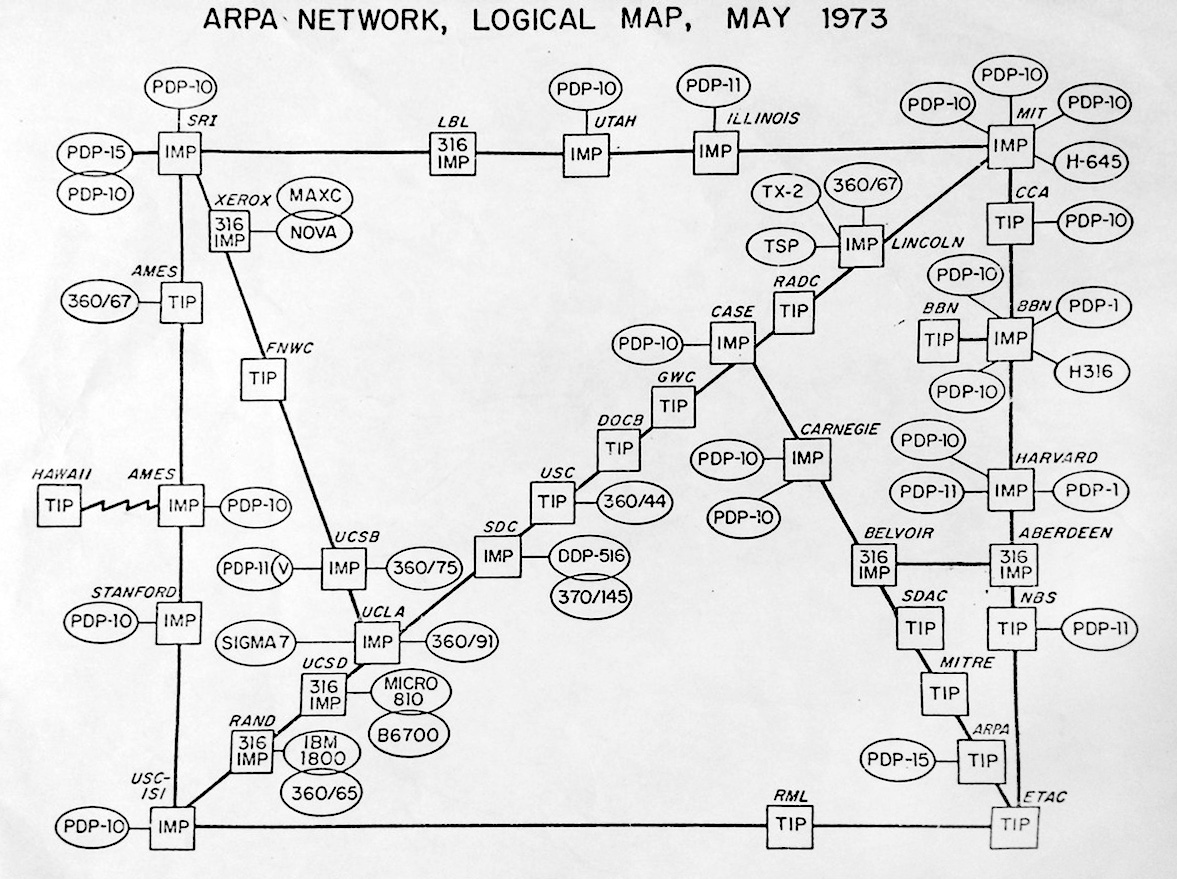
ARPANET network map from 1973 listing Case as an Interface Message Processor (IMP) node

Project Logos, under ARPA contract, was begun within the department on a DEC System-10 (later converted to TENEX (BBN) in conjunction with connection to the ARPANET) to develop a computer-aided computer design system. This system consisted in a distributed, networked, graphics environment, a control and data flow designer and logic (both hardware and software) analyzer. An Imlac PDS-1 with lightpen interrupt was the main design workstation in 1973, communicating with the PDP-10 over a display communications protocol written by Don Huff as a Master Thesis and implemented on the Imlac by Ted Brenneman. Graphics and animation became another departmental focus with the acquisition of an Evans & Sutherland LDS-1 (Line Drawing System-1), which was hosted by the DEC System-10, and later with the acquisition of the stand-alone LDS-2.

Case Western Reserve was one of the earliest universities connected to the ARPANET, predecessor to the Internet. ARPANET went online in 1969; Case Western Reserve was connected in January 1971. Case Western Reserve graduate Ken Biba published the Biba Integrity Model in 1977 and served on the ARPA Working Group that developed the Transmission Control Protocol (TCP) used on the Internet.

It was the first university to have an all-fiber-optic network, in 1989.

At the inaugural meeting in October 1996, Case Western Reserve was one of the 34 charter university members of Internet2.

The university was ranked No. 1 in Yahoo Internet Life's 1999 Most Wired College list. There was a perception that this award was obtained through partially false or inaccurate information submitted for the survey, and the university did not appear at all on the 2000 Most Wired College list (which included 100 institutions). The numbers reported were much lower than those submitted by Ray Neff in 1999. The university had previously placed No. 13 in the 1997 poll.

In August 2003, Case Western Reserve joined the Internet Streaming Media Alliance, then one of only two university members.

In September 2003, Case Western Reserve opened 1,230 public wireless access points on the Case Western Reserve campus and University Circle.

Case Western Reserve was one of the founding members of OneCleveland, formed in October 2003. OneCleveland is an "ultra broadband" (gigabit speed) fiber optic network. This network is for the use of organizations in education, research, government, healthcare, arts, culture, and the nonprofit sector in Greater Cleveland.

Case Western Reserve's Virtual Worlds gaming computer lab opened in 2005. The lab has a large network of Alienware PCs equipped with game development software such as the Torque Game Engine and Maya 3D modeling software. Additionally, it contains a number of specialized advanced computing rooms including a medical simulation room, a MIDI instrument music room, a 3D projection "immersion room", a virtual reality research room, and console room, which features video game systems such as Xbox 360, PlayStation 3, and Wii. This laboratory can be used by any student in the Electrical Engineering and computer science department, and is heavily used for the Game Development (EECS 290) course.

== Student life ==
Student body composition as of May 2, 2022
Race and ethnicity	Total
White	42%
Asian	23%
Foreign national	14%
Hispanic	10%
Other (Note: Other consists of multiracial Americans & those who prefer to not say.)	6%
Black	4%
Economic diversity
Low-income (Note: The percentage of students who received an income-based federal Pell grant intended for low-income students.)	15%
Affluent (Note: The percentage of students who are a part of the American middle class at the bare minimum.)	85%

The primary area for restaurants and shopping is the Uptown district along Euclid Ave adjacent to campus. Cleveland's Little Italy is within walking distance. A campus shuttle runs to Coventry Village, a shopping district in neighboring Cleveland Heights. Popular with students, Downtown Cleveland, Ohio City, Legacy Village, and Shaker Square are all a short driving distance or accessible by RTA.

=== Housing ===
First-year students are grouped into one of four residential colleges that are overseen by first-year coordinators. The Mistletoe, Juniper, and Magnolia residential colleges were established when the "First Year Experience" system was introduced, and Cedar was created in the fall of 2005 to accommodate a large influx of new students. In the fall of 2007, Magnolia was integrated into Mistletoe, however, it was later re-separated in the fall of 2012. The areas of focus for each college are – Cedar: visual and performing arts; Mistletoe: service leadership; Juniper: multiculturalism and Magnolia: sustainability.

Second-year and upper-class housing includes the Triangle apartments, the South Residential Village (SRV), Stephanie Tubbs Jones, Overlook House, and other university-owned properties.

=== Student Clubs and Organizations ===
CWRU boasts hundreds of student clubs across campus.

==== Music ====
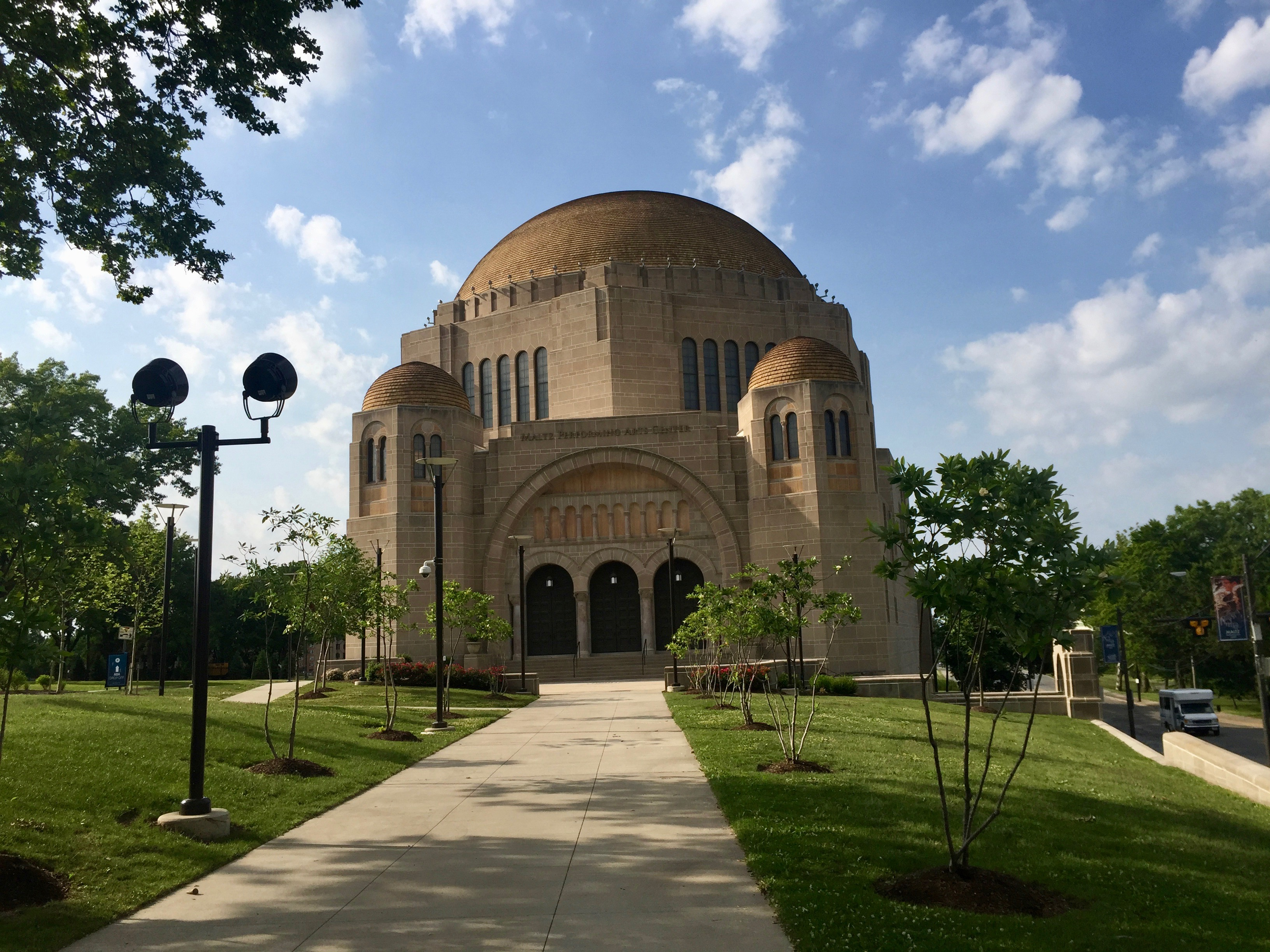
The 1200-seat Maltz Performing Arts Center showcases Case Western Reserve's music department and 19 ensembles.

WRUW-FM (91.1 FM) is the campus radio station of Case Western Reserve University. WRUW broadcasts at a power of 15,000 watts and covers most of Northeast Ohio.

Case Western Reserve is also home to 19 performing ensembles.

For performances, all students, ensembles, and a cappella groups use Harkness Chapel. The bands and orchestra also perform at Severance Hall (the on-campus home of the Cleveland Orchestra) and CIM's Kulas Hall.

==== Design Teams ====
CWRU has many student design teams, both competitive and non-competitive. The list includes, but is not limited to: CWRU Motorsports, which competes in the Baja SAE collegiate design series hosted by the Society of Automotive Engineers (SAE); Case Rocket Team, which competes in the Spaceport America Cup, hosted by the Experimental Sounding Rocket Association (ESRA); Case Aeronautics Team; and CWRUbotix: Robotics Club, which competes in NASA's annual Robotics Mining Competition and the National Robotics Challenge.

=== Greek life ===
Starting in the early 2000s, undergraduate participation in Greek life has generally remained around 30%, with a peak of 42% in the mid-2010s. Currently, around 25% of the campus undergraduates are in a fraternity or sorority. There are 10 sororities and 16 fraternities on campus.

In 2020, many survivors of sexual harassment at the hands of CWRU fraternities began publicly speaking out. Pi Kappa Phi, Zeta Psi, and Zeta Beta Tau were three fraternities that were explicitly called out. In 2020, the Nu chapter of Zeta Psi was suspended by its alumni board. Zeta Psi has not had a presence on campus since; however, the Interfraternity Congress (IFC) of CWRU fraternities lists it as re-establishing in the fall of 2025. The CWRU chapter of Pi Kappa Phi was disbanded in 2023.

In February of 2021, a Title IX compliance review of CWRU was initiated by the U.S. Department of Justice's Civil Rights Division. The investigation was in regards to CWRU's response to reports of sexual harassment in the Greek Life program. The Department concluded that CWRU did not comply with Title IX, and required the university to undergo campus-wide reforms.

=== Safety and security ===
==== Office of Emergency Management ====
The Office of Emergency Management prepares for various levels of emergencies on campus, such as chemical spills, severe weather, infectious diseases, and security threats. RAVE, a multi-platform emergency alerting system, is operated by Emergency Management for issuing emergency alerts and instructions for events on campus. The Office of Emergency Management also performs risk assessment to identify possible safety issues and aims to mitigate these issues. Additionally, CERT is managed through Emergency Management, enabling faculty and staff members to engage in emergency preparedness. The Office of Emergency Management works closely with other campus departments, such as Police and Security Services, University Health Services, and Environmental Health and Safety, as well as community resources including city, state, and federal emergency management agencies.

==== Police and security services ====
Case operates a police force of sworn officers as well as a security officers. CWRU Police also works closely with RTA transit police, University Circle Police, Cleveland Police, East Cleveland Police, Cleveland Heights Police, University Hospitals Police Department, and other surrounding emergency services. Police and Security, with conjunction with the Emergency Management Office, conduct tabletop drills and full-scale exercises involving surrounding emergency services.

==== Emergency Medical Services ====
Case Western Reserve University Emergency Medical Services (CWRU EMS) is a student-run all volunteer ambulance service and a National Collegiate Emergency Medical Services Foundation member. Covering University Circle, CWRU EMS is run solely by undergraduates volunteers, who provides free basic life support level treatment and transport to local hospitals. Crews receive medical direction from University Hospitals.

=== Traditions ===
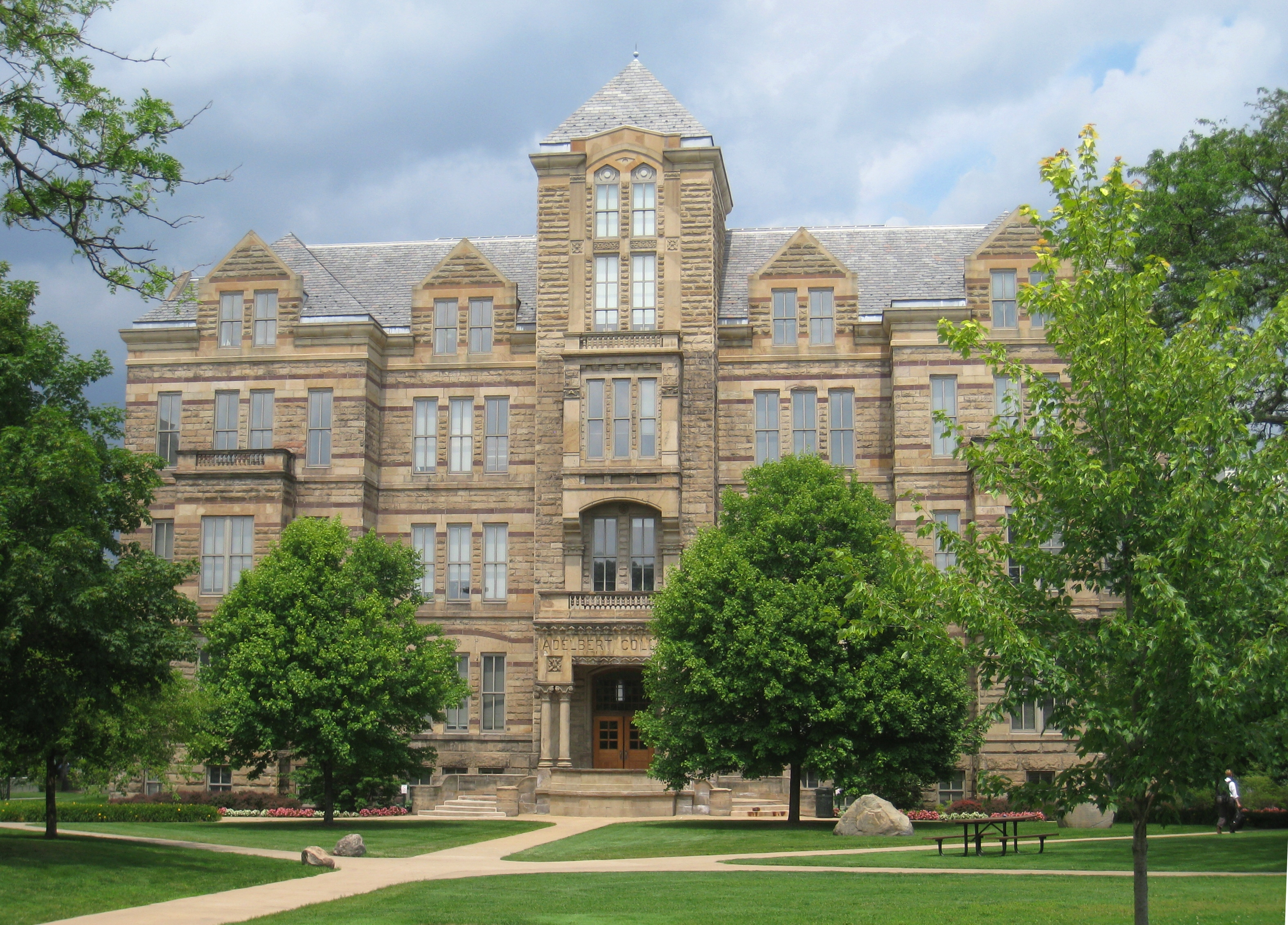
Adelbert Hall

Starting in 1910, the Hudson Relay is an annual relay race event remembering and honoring the university relocation from Hudson, Ohio to Cleveland. Conceived by then-student, Monroe Curtis, the relay race was run from the old college in Hudson, Ohio to the new university in University Circle. Since the mid-1980s, the race has been run entirely in the University Circle area. The race is a distance of 26 miles (42 km). It is held weekend before spring semester finals. Competing running teams are divided by graduating class. If a class wins the relay all four years, tradition dictates a reward of a champagne and steak dinner with the president of the university be awarded. Only six classes have won all four years—1982, 1990, 1994, 2006, 2011, and 2017. The winning classes of each year is carved on an original boulder located behind Adelbert Hall.

Since 1976, the Film Society of Case Western Reserve University has held a science fiction marathon. The film festival, the oldest of its type, boasts more than 34 hours of non-stop movies, cartoons, trailers, and shorts spanning many decades and subgenres, using both film and digital projection. The Film Society, which is student-run and open to the public, also shows movies on Friday and Saturday evenings throughout the school year.

== Athletics ==
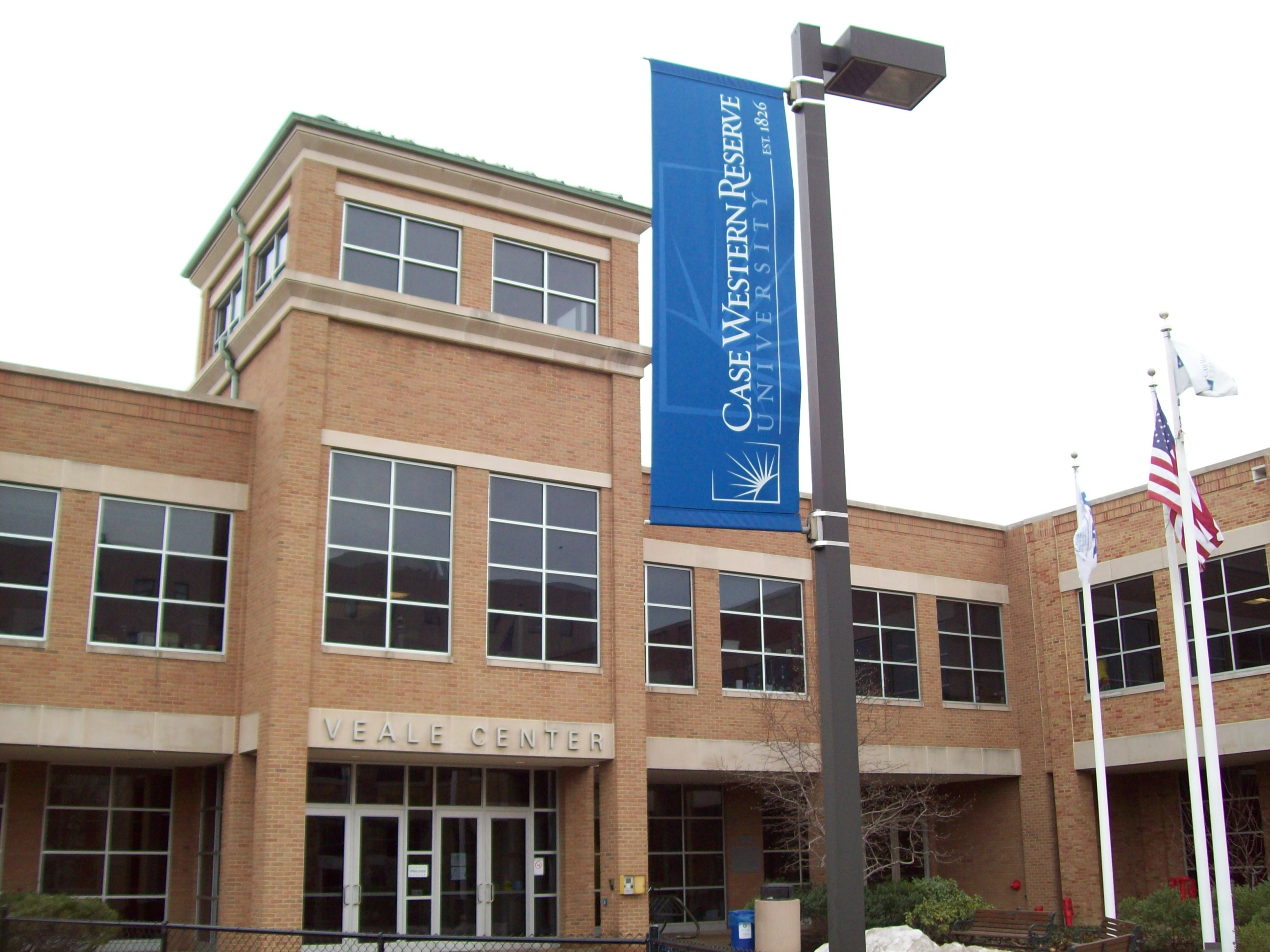
The Veale Athletic Center, which houses much of the Case Western Reserve University athletic and Physical Education departments

Case Western Reserve competes in 19 varsity sports—10 men's sports and 9 women's sports. All 19 varsity teams wear a commemorative patch on their uniforms honoring Case alumnus, M. Frank Rudy, inventor of the Nike air-sole. The Spartans' primary athletic rival is the Carnegie Mellon Tartans. DiSanto Field is home to the football, men's soccer, women's soccer, and track and field teams.

Case Western Reserve is a founding and current member of the University Athletic Association (UAA). The conference participates in the National Collegiate Athletic Association's (NCAA) Division III. Case Institute of Technology and Western Reserve University were also founding members of the Presidents' Athletic Conference (PAC) in 1958. The university remained a member of the PAC after the merger of Case Institute of Technology and Western Reserve University and until 1983. In the fall of 1984, the university joined the North Coast Athletic Conference (NCAC) as a charter member. The 1998–99 school year marked the final season in which the Spartans were members of the NCAC. As the university had held joint conference membership affiliation with the UAA and the NCAC for over a decade. In 2014, the football team began competing as an associate member of the PAC, as only four out of the eight UAA member institutions sponsored football.

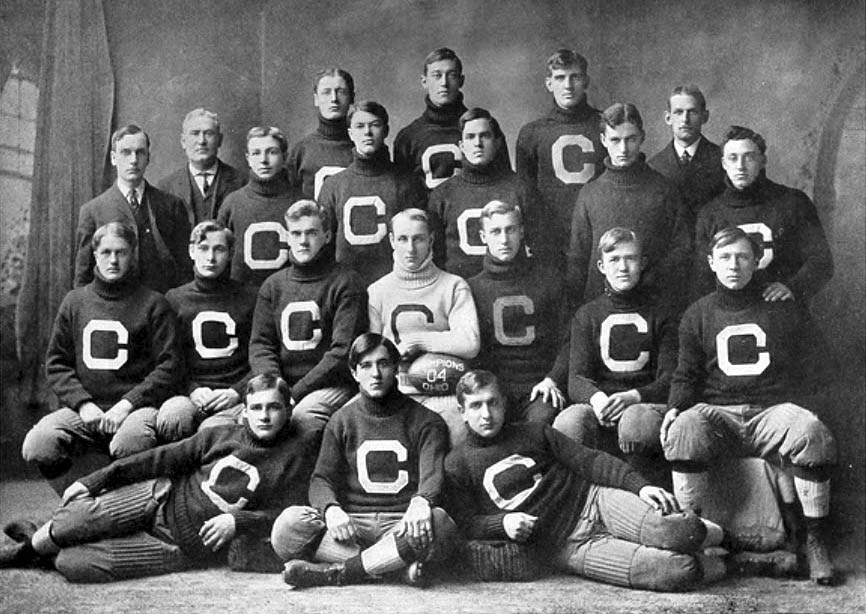
The 1904 Case School of Applied Science football team

The Case Western Reserve football team reemerged in the mid-2000s under the direction of Head Coach Greg Debeljak. The 2007 team finished undefeated earning the school's first playoff appearance and first playoff victory, winning 21-20 against Widener University before losing 38-23 the following week vs Wabash.

== Notable people ==
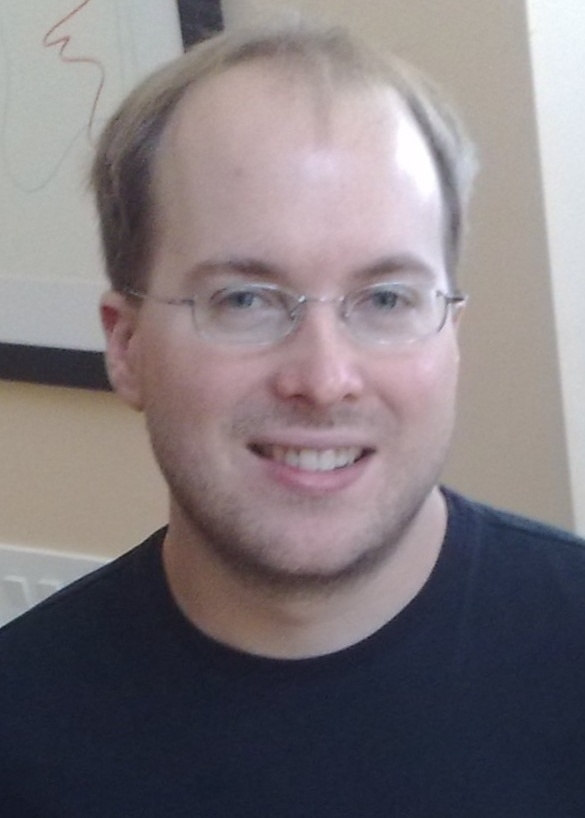
Paul Buchheit, developer of Gmail

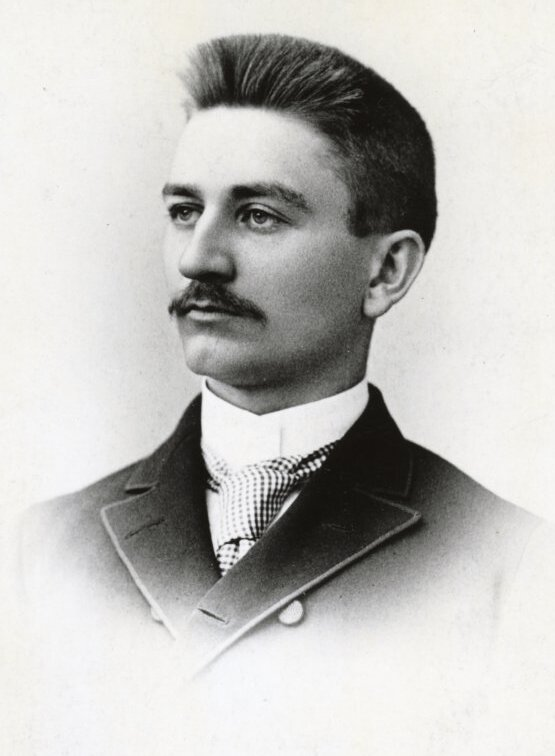
Herbert Henry Dow, founder of the Dow Chemical Company

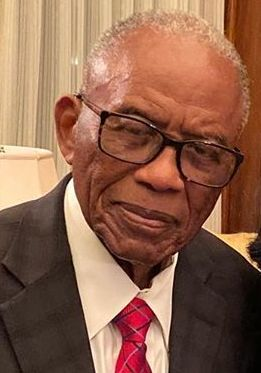
Fred Gray, Civil rights attorney for Rosa Parks, Martin Luther King Jr., and Tuskegee Syphilis Study lawsuit (J.D.'54)

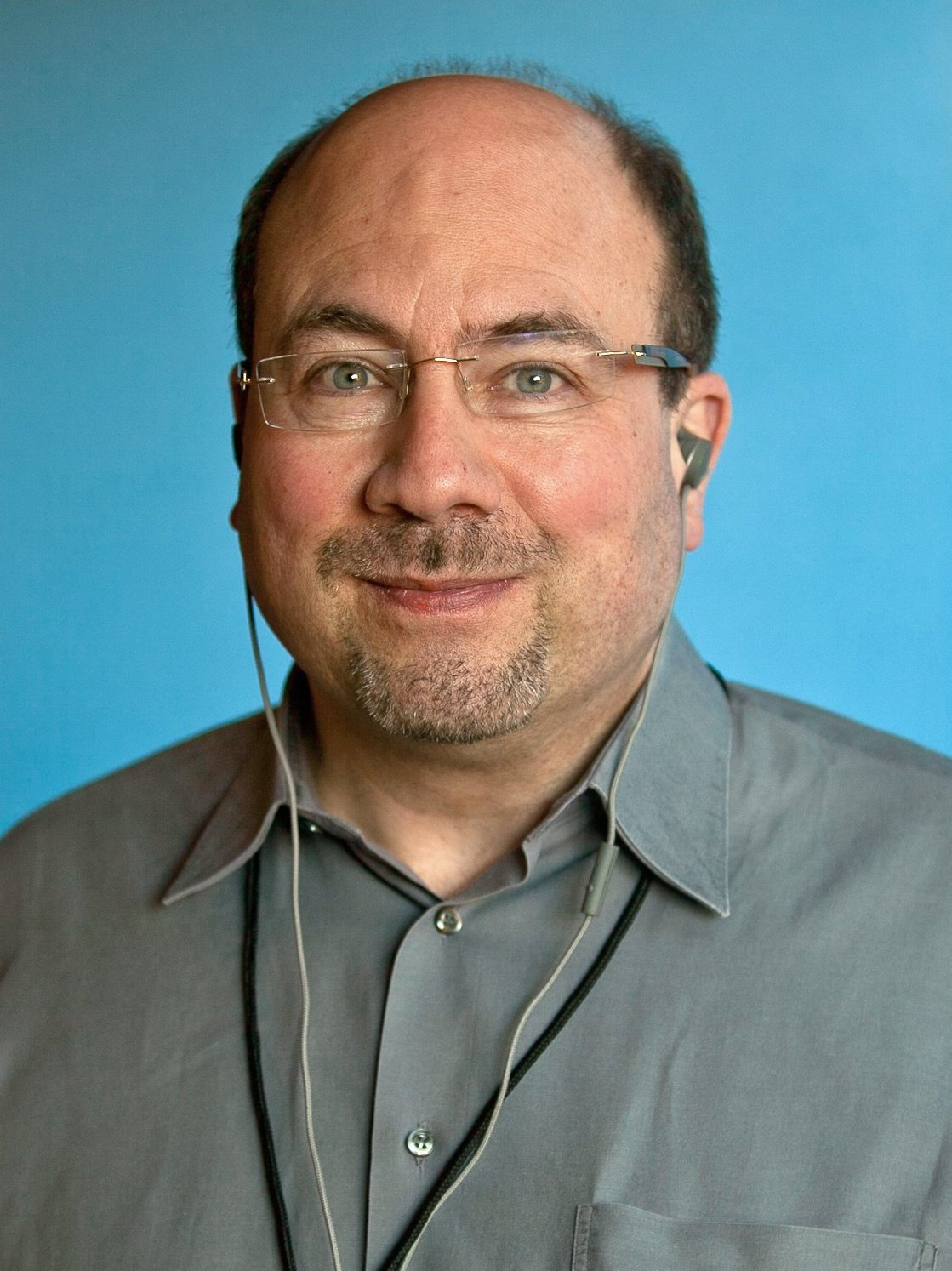
Craig Newmark, tech billionaire, philanthropist, and founder of Craigslist (B.S. '75, M.S. '77)

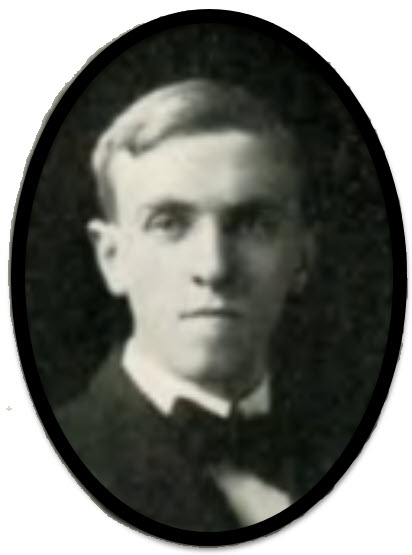
Art Parker, founder of Parker Hannifin Corporation

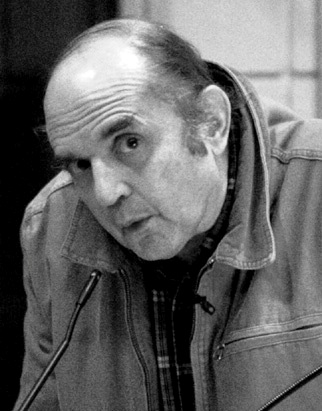
Harvey Pekar, comic book writer and media personality, best known for American Splendor ('61) (Note: Nominal class year: did not graduate)

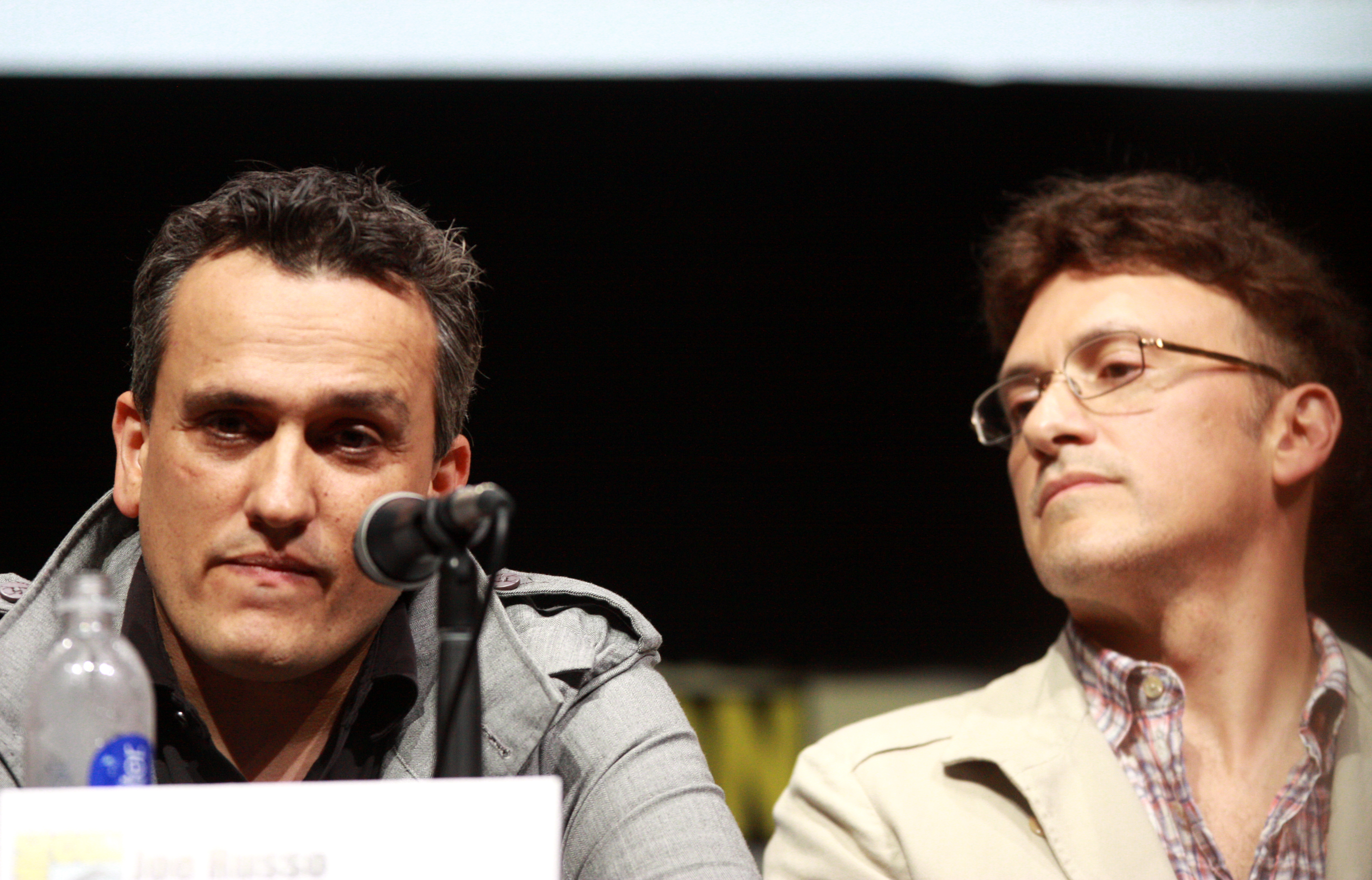
Case alumni Anthony Russo and Joe Russo, film directors and producers best known for their work in the Marvel Cinematic Universe

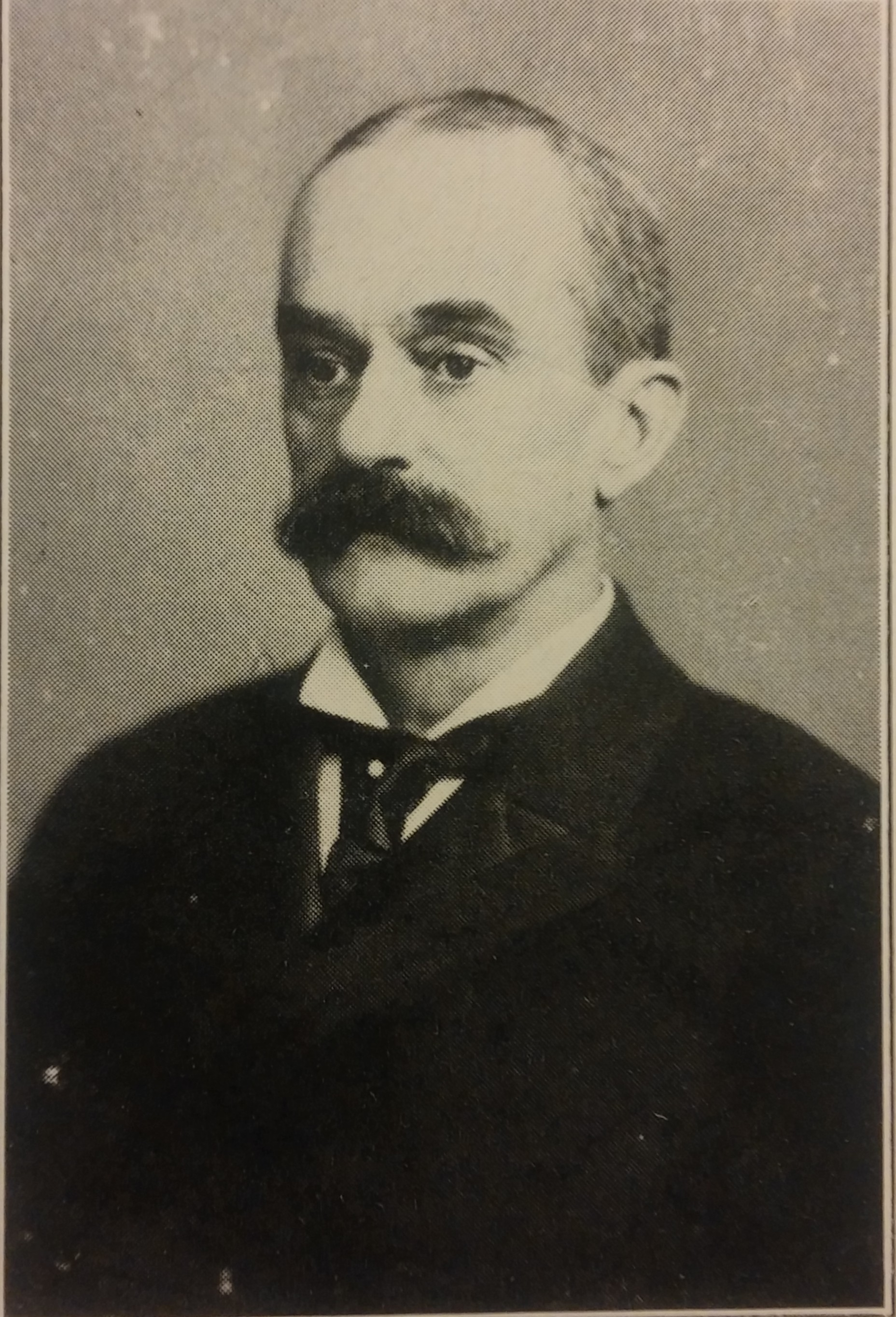
Edward Williams, co-founder of Sherwin-Williams Paints

Notable alumni include John Charles Cutler, former surgeon general who violated human rights and led to deaths in the Tuskegee Syphilis Study, Terre Haute prison experiments, and the syphilis experiments in Guatemala; Anthony Russo and Joe Russo, Hollywood movie directors, Paul Buchheit, creator and lead developer of Gmail; Craig Newmark, billionaire founder of Craigslist; and Peter Tippett, developer of the anti-virus software Vaccine, which Symantec purchased and turned into the popular Norton AntiVirus.

Founders of Fortune 500 companies include Herbert Henry Dow, founder of Dow Chemical, Art Parker, founder of Parker Hannifin, and Edward Williams, co-founder of Sherwin-Williams.

Other notable alumni include Larry Hurtado, New Testament scholar; Harvey Hilbert, a zen master, psychologist and expert on post-Vietnam stress syndrome; Peter Sterling, neuroscientist and co-founder of the concept of allostasis; Ogiame Atuwatse III, Tsola Emiko the 21st Olu of Warri – a historic monarch of the Itsekiri people in Nigeria's Delta region; Donald Knuth, creator of the TeX typesetting system and luminary in early computer algorithms; Terry Sejnowski, who brought computer vision forward as early co-author of the 'godfather of AI'; and Philip M. Morse, who invented the field of operations research that helped win the Battle of the Atlantic.

=== Nobel laureates ===
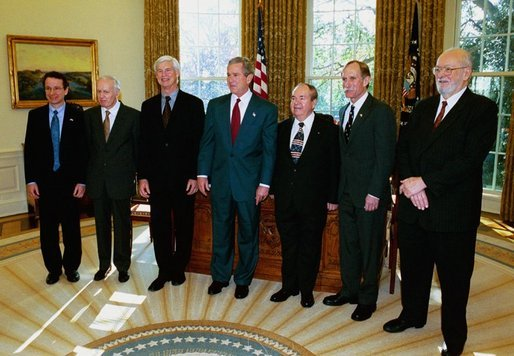
Case Western's 2003 Nobel Prize winners – Paul C. Lauterbur and Peter Agre (1st and 2nd from right) with President George Walker Bush

17 Nobel laureates associated with Case Western Reserve University
Year	Recipient	Prize	Details
1907	Albert A. Michelson	Physics	Former Professor of Physics, the first American scientist to win the Nobel Prize
1923	John J. R. Macleod	Medicine	Former Professor of Physiology
1938	Corneille Heymans	Medicine	Work on carotid sinus reflex
1954	Frederick C. Robbins	Medicine	Former Professor Emeritus of Pediatrics, Dean Emeritus of Medicine, and University Professor Emeritus
1955	Polykarp Kusch	Physics	BS in physics in 1931
1960	Donald A. Glaser	Physics	BS in physics in 1946
1971	Earl W. Sutherland Jr.	Medicine	Professor and chair of pharmacology
1980	Paul Berg	Chemistry	PhD in 1952
1988	George H. Hitchings	Medicine	Professor and researcher
1994	Alfred G. Gilman	Medicine	MD and PhD in 1969
1994	George A. Olah	Chemistry	Professor and chair of chemistry
1995	Frederick Reines	Physics	Professor and chair of physics
1998	Ferid Murad	Medicine	MD and PhD in 1965. Former trustee of Case
2003	Paul C. Lauterbur	Physiology or Medicine	BS in chemistry
2003	Peter Agre	Chemistry	Instructor, 1978 Internal Medicine alumnus
2004	Edward C. Prescott	Economics	MS in operations research in 1964
2017	Richard Thaler	Economics	BA in economics in 1967

== See also ==
- Association of Independent Technological Universities
