= Anant Madabhushi =

American biomedical engineer (born 1976)

Anant Madabhushi (born February 15, 1976) is a prominent biomedical engineer renowned for his pioneering work in developing artificial intelligence (AI) tools to enhance disease diagnosis, prognosis, and treatment planning. He holds a primary faculty appointment in the Department of Biomedical Engineering at Emory University and Georgia Institute of Technology, with secondary appointments in the Departments of Radiology and Imaging Sciences, Biomedical Informatics, and Pathology. Additionally, Dr. Madabhushi serves as the executive director of the Emory Empathetic AI for Health Institute.

In 2018, the magazine Prevention included Madabhushi's work on "Smart Imaging Computers" for identifying lung cancer patients who could benefit from chemotherapy on a list called "The 10 Most Incredible Medical Breakthroughs of 2018”. In 2019, Madabhushi was one of five scientists included in an article in Nature titled "Offbeat approaches to cancer research".

== Education ==
Dr. Madabhushi earned his Bachelor of Engineering in Biomedical Engineering from Mumbai University in 1998. He then obtained a Master of Science in Biomedical Engineering from the University of Texas at Austin in 2000, followed by a PhD in Bioengineering from the University of Pennsylvania in 2004.

== Career ==
Prior to his current roles, Dr. Madabhushi was a professor in the Department of Biomedical Engineering at Rutgers, The State University of New Jersey, USA, from 2005 to 2012. In 2012, joined Case Western Reserve University's Department of Biomedical Engineering as an associate professor. Until 2022, Dr. Madabhushi held the position of Donnell Institute Professor and served as the director of the university's Center for Computational Imaging and Personalized Diagnostics (CCIPD).

In 2022, Dr. Madabhushi transitioned to Emory University, where he continues his research and leadership in biomedical engineering and AI applications in healthcare.

== Research ==
Dr. Madabhushi has authored over 450 peer-reviewed publications and holds more than 100 patents in areas including artificial intelligence, radiomics, computational pathology, medical image analysis, and computer vision. His research focuses on developing AI-based approaches for analyzing digital pathology and radiology images to improve diagnosis, prognosis, and prediction of treatment responses across various diseases, including different types of cancers, cardiovascular diseases, kidney diseases, and ophthalmologic conditions.

He has secured nearly $80 million in grant funding and co-founded three companies. His work emphasizes eliminating racial disparities in medicine by developing AI tools that employ population-specific risk-prediction models, thereby enabling personalized healthcare.

== Awards and memberships ==
Dr. Madabhushi is a Fellow of the American Institute of Medical and Biological Engineering, the Institute of Electrical and Electronics Engineers (IEEE), and the National Academy of Inventors. In 2017, he received the IEEE Engineering in Medicine and Biology Society award for technical achievements in computational imaging and digital pathology. In 2021, he was recognized as one of Crain's Cleveland Business Notable Entrepreneurs of the year and received a Faculty Distinguished Research Award from Case Western Reserve University.

== Selected publications ==
- Flannery, B. T., Sandler, H. M., Lal, P., Feldman, M. D., Santa-Rosario, J. C., Pathak, T., Mirtti, T., Farre, X., Correa, R., Chafe, S., Shah, A., Efstathiou, J. A., Hoffman, K., Hallman, M. A., Straza, M., Jordan, R., Pugh, S. L., Feng, F., & Madabhushi, A. (2025). Stress testing deep learning models for prostate cancer detection on biopsies and surgical specimens. The Journal of Pathology, 245(2), 123-134.
- Wu, Y., Xu, X., Cheng, Y., Zhang, X., Liu, F., Li, Z., Hu, L., Madabhushi, A., Gao, P., Liu, Z., & Lu, C. (2025). BEEx Is an Open-Source Tool That Evaluates Batch Effects in Medical Images to Enable Multicenter Studies. Cancer Research, 85(1), 45-56.
- Xu, H., Wang, M., Shi, D., Qin, H., Zhang, Y., Liu, Z., Madabhushi, A., Gao, P., Cong, F., & Lu, C. (2025). When multiple instance learning meets foundation models: Advancing histological whole slide image analysis. Medical Image Analysis, 72, 102145.
