= Blue Ridge Institute for Medical Research =

US research institute

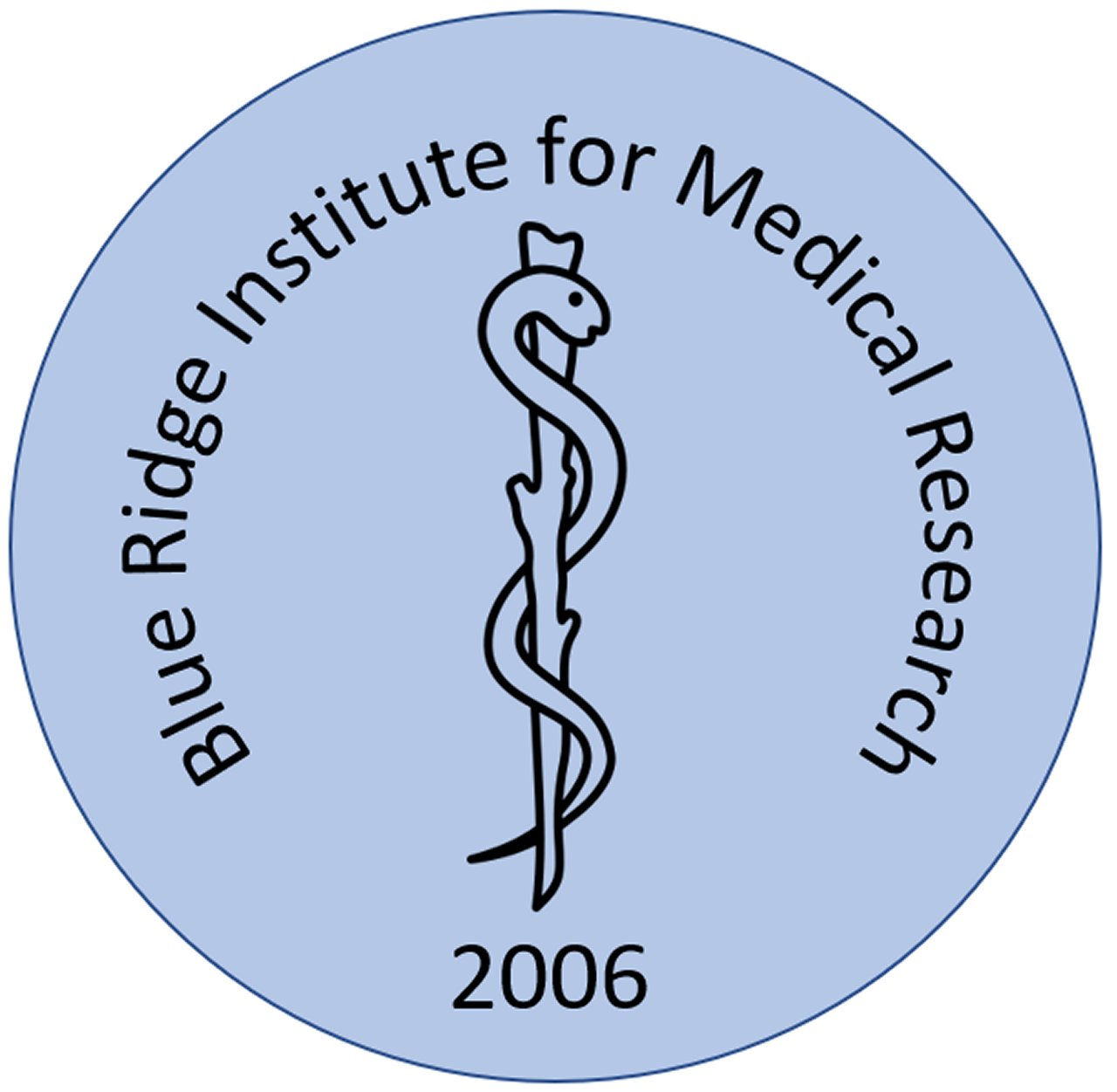
- Established: 2006
- Research type: Unclassified/classified
- Director: Robert Roskoski Jr.
- Location: Horse Shoe, North Carolina, U.S.
- Website: brimr.org

The Blue Ridge Institute for Medical Research (BRIMR) is an independent, non-profit, scientific research institute located in Horse Shoe, North Carolina. The Institute was founded by Robert Roskoski Jr., who serves as President and Scientific Director.

== Mission ==
The general goals of the Institute are to explore the interrelationships of fundamental biological science, clinical science, and clinical care.

== Research ==
Research at BRIMR focuses on the structure and regulation of protein kinases, their downstream signaling pathways, and therapeutic drugs that inhibit these enzymes. Protein kinases regulate the activity of their substrate targets by adding phosphate groups in a reaction known as protein phosphorylation. The United States Food and Drug Administration has approved the use of about 50 protein kinase inhibitors for the treatment of several cancers including those of breast, kidney, and lung and inflammatory diseases such as rheumatoid arthritis and ulcerative colitis. An average of two to three new drugs of this type is approved annually.

An important component of the Institute's fundamental research involves the study of the nature of the interaction of these anticancer and anti-inflammatory agents with their target protein kinase enzyme. Institute studies are based upon the X-ray crystallographic results that are in the public domain as well as in-house computer-generated models of drugs binding to their targets. The Institute functions as a scientific think tank and performs no actual laboratory work. However, the Institute uses results from the research areas of biochemistry and molecular, chemical, structural and cancer biology in an effort to understand the mechanisms of action of protein kinase inhibitors and the aberrations that result in neoplastic growth.

The results of these studies have been published.

== NIH funding data ==
The Blue Ridge Institute for Medical Research has monitored NIH funding to Medical Schools as well as other health science schools and organizations since 2006. BRIMR generates an annual ranking of NIH funding for US Medical Schools and their Departments and the BRIMR data is considered to be the gold standard for medical school research metrics. These data are used throughout the biomedical community for the analysis of medical research and educational activities

== Selected publications ==
- Roskoski, R. Jr. (2015) A historical overview of protein kinases and their targeted small molecule inhibitors. Pharmacol. Res. 100, 1-23.
- Roskoski, R. Jr. (2016) Classification of small molecule inhibitors based upon the structures of their drug-enzyme complexes. Pharmacol. Res. 103, 26–48.
- Roskoski, R. Jr. (2019) Properties of FDA-approved small molecule protein kinase inhibitors. Pharmacol. Res. 144, 19–50.
- Noble, Paige; Ten Eyck, Patrick; Roskoski Jr., Robert; Jackson; J. Brooks (2020) NIH funding trends to US Medical Schools from 2009 to 2018. PLoSOne 15:eo233367.
