= List of presidents of Case Western Reserve University =

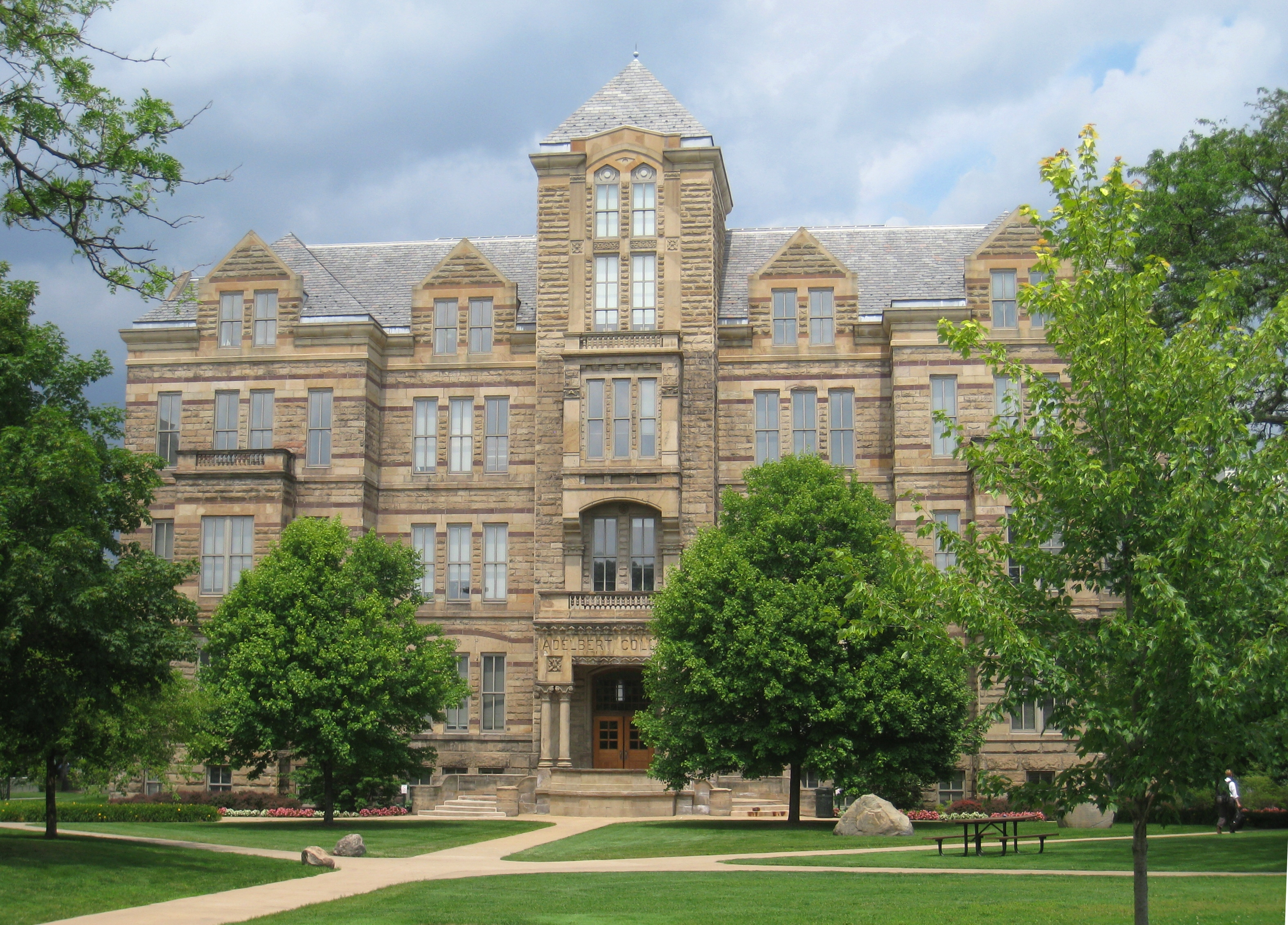
Adelbert Hall, location of the university president's office.

The president of Case Western Reserve University is the principal executive office for Case Western Reserve University, located in Cleveland, Ohio.

Founded in 1826, Western Reserve College appointed its first president in 1830, Rev. Charles Backus Storrs. With its Presbyterian origins, the school's first eight presidents carried the title Reverend. With roots of being located in the old Connecticut Western Reserve, the college held strong influences from Yale College, with four of its first five presidents—Pierce, Hitchcock, Cutler, and Hayden—being Yale alumni.

Founded in 1880, Case School of Applied Science appointed its first president in 1886, Cady Staley.

In 1967, Case Western Reserve University was created through the federation of Case Institute of Technology and Western Reserve University. Robert W. Morse became the first president of the newly combined university.

== List of presidents ==
=== Western Reserve College/University ===
The following ten persons had served as president of Western Reserve College/University from 1830 to 1967:

No.	Image	President	Term start	Term end	Refs.
1		Rev. Charles Backus Storrs (Note: First president of Western Reserve College)	1830	June 26, 1833	
2		Rev. George Edmond Pierce (Note: Founded the School of Medicine and constructed the Loomis Observatory.)	1834	July 1855	
3		Rev. Henry Lawrence Hitchcock (Note: President during the Civil War)	July 1855	June 27, 1871	
4		Rev. Carroll Cutler (Note: Moved the college to Cleveland and renamed to Western Reserve University)	Fall 1871	June 23, 1886	
5		Rev. Hiram Collins Haydn	1887	November 1890	
6		Rev. Charles Franklin Thwing	November 1890	November 11, 1921	
7 Acting		Rev. James DeLong Williamson	November 11, 1921	June 12, 1923	
8		Rev. Robert Ernest Vinson	June 13, 1923	December 4, 1933	
Acting		Winfred George Leutner	December 4, 1933	June 11, 1934	
9		Winfred George Leutner	June 12, 1934	June 30, 1949	
10		John Schoff Millis	September 1, 1949	June 30, 1967	

Table notes:

=== Case School of Applied Science / Institute of Technology ===
The following five persons had served as president of Case School of Applied Science / Institute of Technology from 1886 to 1967:

No.	Image	President	Term start	Term end	Refs.
1		Cady Staley (Note: First President of Case School of Applied Science.)	September 1, 1886	June 5, 1902	
–		Charles Sumner Howe	November 3, 1902	May 31, 1903	
2		Charles Sumner Howe	June 1, 1903	Summer 1929	
3		William Elgein Wickenden	September 1, 1929	August 31, 1947	
4		Thomas Keith Glennan (Note: Oversaw name change transition to Case Institute of Technology.)	September 1, 1947	June 30, 1966	
5		Robert Warren Morse	September 1, 1966	June 30, 1967	

Table notes:

=== Case Western Reserve University ===
The following persons had served as president of Case Western Reserve University since 1967:

No.	Image	President	Term start	Term end	Refs.
1		Robert Warren Morse (Note: First president of Case Western Reserve University)	September 1, 1967	June 30, 1970	
2		Louis Adelbert Toepfer	September 13, 1970	June 30, 1980	
3		David Vincent Ragone	July 1, 1980	June 30, 1987	
4		Agnar Pytte	July 1, 1987	June 30, 1999	
5		David Henry Auston	July 1, 1999	April 27, 2001	
6 Interim		James W. Wagner	May 3, 2001	July 30, 2002	
7		Edward M. Hundert	August 1, 2002	June 2, 2006	
8 Interim		Gregory L. Eastwood	June 2, 2006	June 30, 2007	
9		Barbara Rook Snyder (Note: First female president)	July 1, 2007	September 30, 2020	
10; Interim		Scott Cowen	October 1, 2020	June 30, 2021	
11		Eric William Kaler	July 1, 2021	incumbent	

Note: Unlike other academic institutions, Case Western Reserve University includes interim presidents in their official count of presidents. For example, Eric Kaler is considered their 11th president and not their 8th when interim leaders are excluded.

Table notes:

== See also ==
- List of Case Western Reserve University people
