= Susan Fessenden =

American temperance worker (1840–1932)

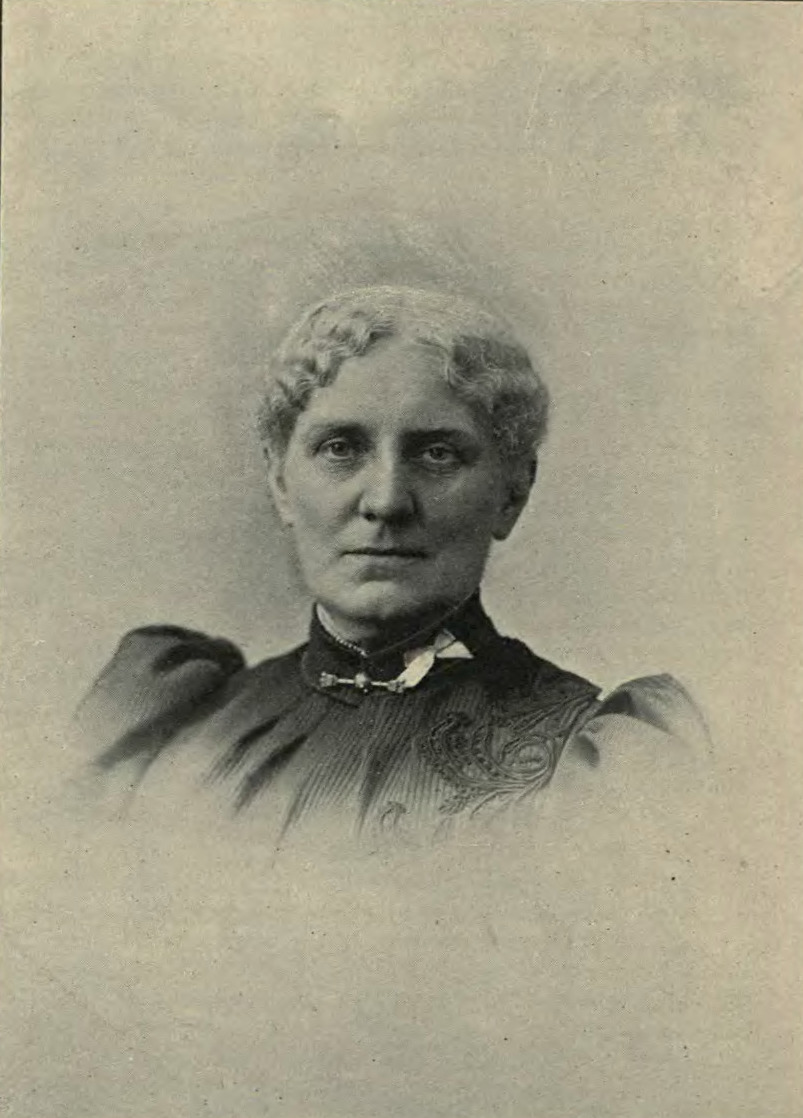
- Photo portrait from Thumb Nail Sketches of White Ribbon Women, 1895
- Born: Susan Breese Snowden; December 10, 1840; Cincinnati, Ohio, U.S.
- Died: September 12, 1932 (aged 91); Northfield, Minnesota, U.S.
- Education: Cincinnati Female Seminary
- Occupations: activist; social reformer; lecturer
- Organizations: Woman's Christian Temperance Union; Young Women's Christian Association
- Known for: President, Massachusetts Woman's Christian Temperance Union; Vice-president, Massachusetts Woman's Suffrage Association
- Movement: temperance
- Spouse: John Henry Fessenden Sr. (m. 1864; died 1922)
- Children: 3
- Relatives: Theodore Dwight Woolsey; Carroll Cutler; Samuel Finley Breese Morse; Samuel Livingston Breese; Maria Mitchell; John Greene; Roger Williams; Caleb Carr

Susan Fessenden (née, Snowden; December 10, 1840 – September 12, 1932) was an American temperance worker, characterized as a progressive thinker upon all lines of reform. She served as President of the Massachusetts Woman's Christian Temperance Union (WCTU), National Lecturer for the WCTU, and vice-president of the Massachusetts Woman's Suffrage Association. She was a leader and teacher of classes in parliamentary law. She also frequently responded to invitations to preach in Congregational, Baptist, and Methodist pulpits.

== Early life and education ==
Susan Breese Snowden was born in Cincinnati, Ohio, December 10, 1840. Her father, Sidney Snowden, was related through his mother to President Theodore Dwight Woolsey of Yale College, President Carroll Cutler of Western Reserve, Samuel Finley Breese Morse, of telegraph fame, to Commodore Samuel Livingston Breese of the United States Navy, and to many other literary and scientific men. Mr. Snowden was a man of letters, remarkable for his rendering of William Shakespeare, for his use of English, and for his eloquence. He died at the early age of forty-two. His wife, Eliza Mitchell, lived to the age of eighty. She was the daughter of Jethro and Mercy (Greene) Mitchell, both of well-known Quaker families. Jethro Mitchell was a native of Nantucket and a cousin of Maria Mitchell. He went to Cincinnati about 1830. Through her grandmother, Mercy Greene Mitchell, Mrs. Fessenden claimed descent from John Greene, of Warwick, Rhode Island, from Roger Williams, from Governor Caleb Carr, and from other founders of Rhode Island.

At the age of 12, she united with the Presbyterian church, at a time when young people were rarely admitted to church membership.

She was educated in the Cincinnati Female Seminary, graduating in 1857, at the age of seventeen, being the youngest member of her class.

== Career ==
She began to teach in the seminary immediately after graduating, and continued to teach there until her marriage in 1864. She also took part during that time in church and temperance work. Early in life, Fessenden found that she could most effectively help the causes in which she was interested by the spoken rather than the written word; her literary work was confined to articles on vital subjects and stories for children's magazines.

On March 10, 1864, she married John Henry Fessenden Sr. (1838-1922), of Concord, New Hampshire. Her three children—Cornelia Snowden (b. 1864), Elizabeth Mitchell (b. 1866), and William Chaftin (b. 1869)—were born in Cincinnati, and until they had completed their education the mother's chief interest was in them and in her home life.

=== Sioux City, Iowa ===
In 1871, Fessenden removed from Cincinnati to Sioux City, Iowa. There she remained for eleven years, taking an active interest in everything pertaining to that growing town. Its educational affairs were important to her; its schools became clubs for study. Its philanthropic affairs, work for young girls, and plans for helping the poor and tempted were always on her mind. Just as in her earlier years she had not hesitated to express herself strongly on the abolition of slavery, she now hailed strong convictions regarding woman's enfranchisement, help for the laboring classes, and prohibition of the liquor traffic. She wrote and spoke on all these subjects.

While living in Sioux City, it became necessary for her to assume the support of her three young children. Their education was the determined purpose of her life. Accordingly, she borrowed money and bought out a china and silverware establishment, and carried on a wholesale and retail business. Although she had no business education, had not studied bookkeeping, and hitherto had been wholly unacquainted with business, she made a marked success of this enterprise, and continued in it until the necessity was passed.

Convinced of the need of organized effort, Fessenden started the Young Women's Christian Association (Y.W.C.A.) of Sioux City, whose work soon had a much wider scope than that of such organizations in larger cities. The Association rented an old building, where rooms were fitted up for the poor. One room was converted into a chapel, and religious services were held there regularly the year round. A parlor organ, chandelier, and stove were donated by Fessenden, and she held herself personally responsible for every service. During a season of great floods on the Mississippi River, midnight often found her still superintending the lighting and heating of the building and the feeding and putting to bed of the hundreds of homeless who sought temporary shelter. Her own house was stripped of chairs for women with young children, and she did her utmost, both as an individual and as President of the Y.W.C.A., the organization having assumed the care of these needy people.

Later, she was elected president of the Sioux City WCTU.

Just before leaving Sioux City, Fessenden selected the site and measured the lot on which was to be built a home for the organization which she had for eight years served so faithfully as President: the Samaritan Hospital, carried on by the Y.W.C.A. Although other hospitals were later built in Sioux City, this, the first, continued to have the confidence and the support of the community.

=== Boston, Massachusetts ===
In 1882, Fessenden removed to Boston, Massachusetts for the college education of her children. Her two daughters entered Boston University with the classes of 1886 and 1889, respectively, and later her son with the class of 1894.

After the graduation of her elder daughter, Fessenden took her family to Europe, that Cornelia might prepare herself to take the degree Ph.D. After six months of study and an illness of only three days, Cornelia died.

Upon her return to the U.S., Fessenden's friends prevailed upon her to enter on work with the WCTU. First she was made National Superintendent of Franchise. In 1890, she was unanimously elected to the office of State President of the WCTU of Massachusetts, and continued in that office for eight years.

At the time of the Hamidian massacres, in 1896, Frances Willard and Lady Henry Somerset sent about 200 refugees to New York City. By cable, they requested Fessenden among others to receive them at Ellis Island, and to overcome if possible the construction of law that might bar them from admission. In carrying out her part of this work, it became necessary for Fessenden to visit New York three times, consulting with the commissioner of immigration and addressing ministers' meetings to secure their signatures to a petition to the U.S. government to call these people "refugees" and not "immigrants". By this wording, it was possible to avoid violating a most beneficent law. It was necessary also for her to secure the signing of the bond for US$40,000. The WCTU had to pledge that none of the refugees should ever claim government support. When these details had been arranged, 100 refugees went to the Massachusetts WCTU. and 100 to The Salvation Army. To find work for these refugees, who did not speak English or know the customs of the U.S. was a large undertaking.

As President of the Massachusetts WCTU, Fessenden had many interesting experiences. One of these was when, through the invitation from the captain and chaplain, she conducted on the United States battleship Massachusetts a Sunday service which was attended by sailors from three vessels. Another was the occasion when she presided at the banquet and reception to Lady Henry Somerset at the Boston Music Hall; and a third at Hotel Vendome, the breakfast to Frances E. Willard, at which there were six hundred guests. An experience of a different kind, which she felt her office required of her, was a visit she made to the slums, that she might see for herself life in its various phases. Accompanied by two policemen, she spent the entire night in the worst part of Boston, visiting Chinese and Italian quarters, police stations, and so-called hotels.

In 1898, she resigned the presidency to become National Lecturer. In 1899, Fessenden had a second great loss in the death of her only son, William, who had graduated from Andover Theological Seminary in the previous year, and had entered upon his first pastorate at New Boston, Mass. As National Lecturer, Fessenden traveled widely in the U.S., and also spent two years abroad. She also frequently responded to invitations to preach in Congregational, Baptist, and Methodist pulpits.

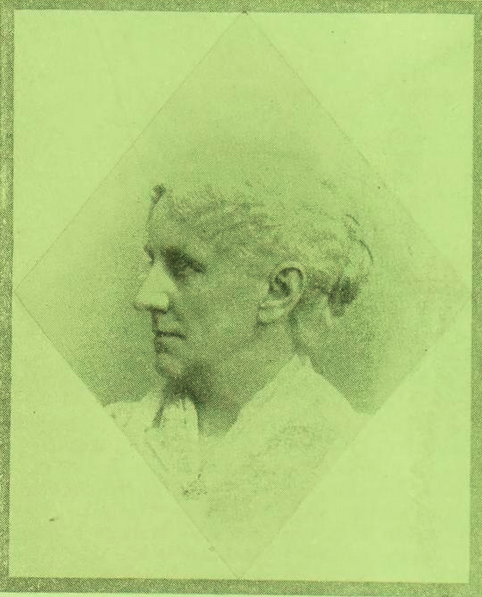
(undated)

Fessenden carried on the lecture platform work until 1910. After that time, she contributed service as health and strength permitted. Regarded as one of the most scholarly and statesmanlike speakers that the white ribbon temperance movement produced, in 1913, Fessenden was made a life member of the World's WCTU.

== Personal life ==
In 1903, when Fessenden revisited her old home in Sioux City, the trustees of the Samaritan Hospital gave her a reception in recognition of the fact that to her efforts they were indebted for the conception of the hospital.

In later life, she resided with her daughter at Northfield, Rice County, Minnesota. Susan Fessenden died in Northfield, September 12, 1932.
