= Dielectric wall accelerator =

Patent sketch for the DWA

A dielectric wall accelerator (DWA) is a compact linear particle accelerator concept designed and patented in the late 1990s, that works by inducing a travelling electromagnetic wave in a tube which is constructed mostly from a dielectric material. The main conceptual difference to a conventional disk-loaded linac system is given by the additional dielectric wall and the coupler construction.

Possible uses of this concept include its application in external beam radiotherapy (EBRT) using protons or ions.

== Operation ==
An external alternating-current power supply provides an electromagnetic wave that is transmitted to the accelerator tube using a waveguide. The power supply is switched on only a very short time (pulsed operation).

Electromagnetic induction creates a traveling electric field, which accelerates charged particles. The traveling wave overlaps with the position of the charged particles, leading to their acceleration inside as they pass through the tube's vacuum channel. The field inside the tube is negative just ahead of the proton and positive just behind the proton. Because protons are positively charged, they accelerate toward the negative and away from the positive. The power supply switches the polarity of the sections, so they stay synchronized with the passing proton.

== Construction ==
The accelerator tube is made from sheets of fused silica, only 250 μm thick. After polishing, the sheets are coated with 0.5 μm of chromium and 2.5 μm of gold. About 80 layers of the sheets are stacked together, and then heated in a brazing furnace, where they fuse together. The stacked assembly is then machined into a hollow cylinder. Fused silica is pure transparent quartz glass, a dielectric, which is why the machine is called a "dielectric wall accelerator."

A sketch of one of the assembled modules of the accelerator is shown in the patent sketch. The module is about 3 cm long, and the beam travels upward. The dielectric wall is seen as item number 81. It is surrounded by a pulse-forming device called a Blumlein. In figure 8A, the power supply charges the Blumlein. In figure 8B, silicon carbide switches surrounding the Blumlein close, shorting out the edge of the Blumlein. The energy stored in the Blumlein rushes toward the dielectric wall as a high voltage pulse.

== Usage in proton therapy ==
Dielectric wall accelerators have the potential to replace the currently used proton accelerators in radiation therapy, due to their smaller size, cost advantages, and reduced shielding requirements.

=== Advantages and limitations ===
The DWA addresses the main issues with the current proton therapy systems—cost and size. Depending on the desired final beam energy, the conventional medical accelerator solutions (cyclotrons and small synchrotrons) can have large cost factors and space requirements, which could be circumvented by DWAs. The cost estimate for a DWA is about 20 million US dollars.

DWAs are expected to reach acceleration gradients around 100 MV/m.

The system is a spinoff of a DOE device to inspect nuclear weapons. This system requires several new advances because of the high energies, e.g., high gradient insulators. A wide band-gap photoconductive switch, about 4,000, is needed. A symmetric Blumlein, typical width 1 mm.
