= Charles Storrs =

Charles Storrs may refer to:

- Charles Storrs (1822–1884) of Charles and Augustus Storrs, American brothers who co-founded the University of Connecticut
- Charles Backus Storrs (1794–1833), first president of Western Reserve College and Preparatory School
