= Robert Ernest Vinson =

President of the University of Texas at Austin from 1916 to 1923

Robert E. Vinson
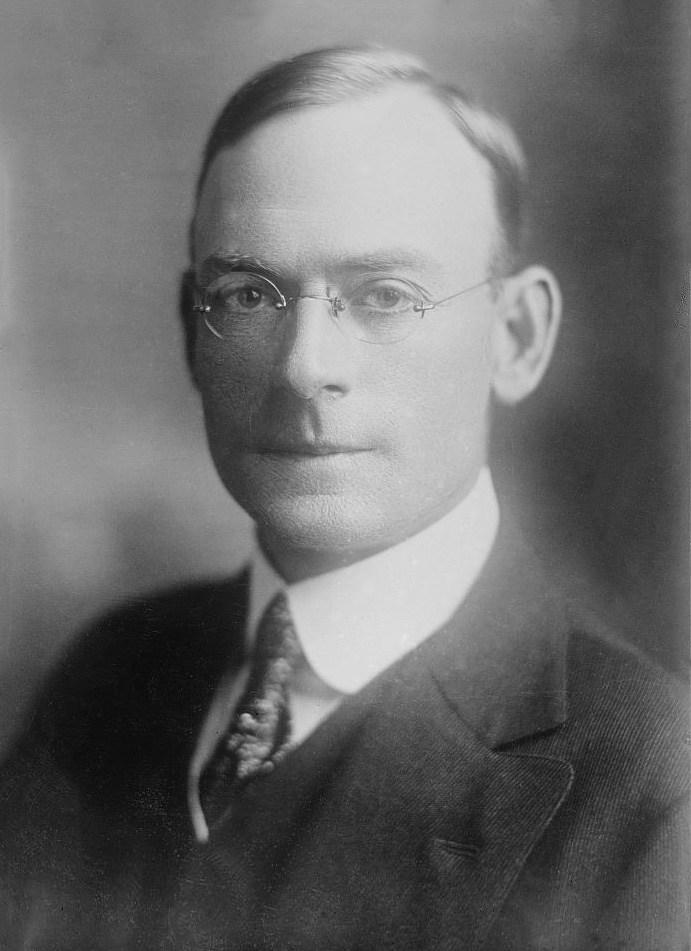
- Vinson in 1916

7th President of University of Texas at Austin
- In office 1916–1923

8th President of Western Reserve University
- In office 1923–1933
- Preceded by: James D. Williamson
- Succeeded by: Winfred G. Leutner

Personal details
- Born: November 4, 1876
- Died: September 2, 1945 (aged 68)
- Education: Austin College; Union Theological Seminary

Rev. Robert Ernest Vinson (November 4, 1876 – September 2, 1945) was president of the University of Texas at Austin from 1916 to 1923. He was president of Western Reserve University, now Case Western Reserve University, from 1923 to 1933.

== Biography ==
He was born on November 4, 1876, in White Oak, South Carolina, to John Vinson (1845–1917) and Mary Elizabeth Brice (1843–1895). He earned a bachelor's degree from Austin College in 1896. He earned a divinity degree from Union Theological Seminary in Virginia in 1899. In 1902 he attended the University of Chicago in Illinois. He was the president of Austin Presbyterian Theological Seminary from 1906 to 1916.

He was president of the University of Texas at Austin from 1916 to 1923. He was president of Case Western Reserve University from 1923 to 1933. He died on September 2, 1945. He was buried in West Hill Cemetery in Sherman, Texas.

== See also ==
- List of University of Texas at Austin presidents
