= James DeLong Williamson =

American minister and academic

James D. Williamson
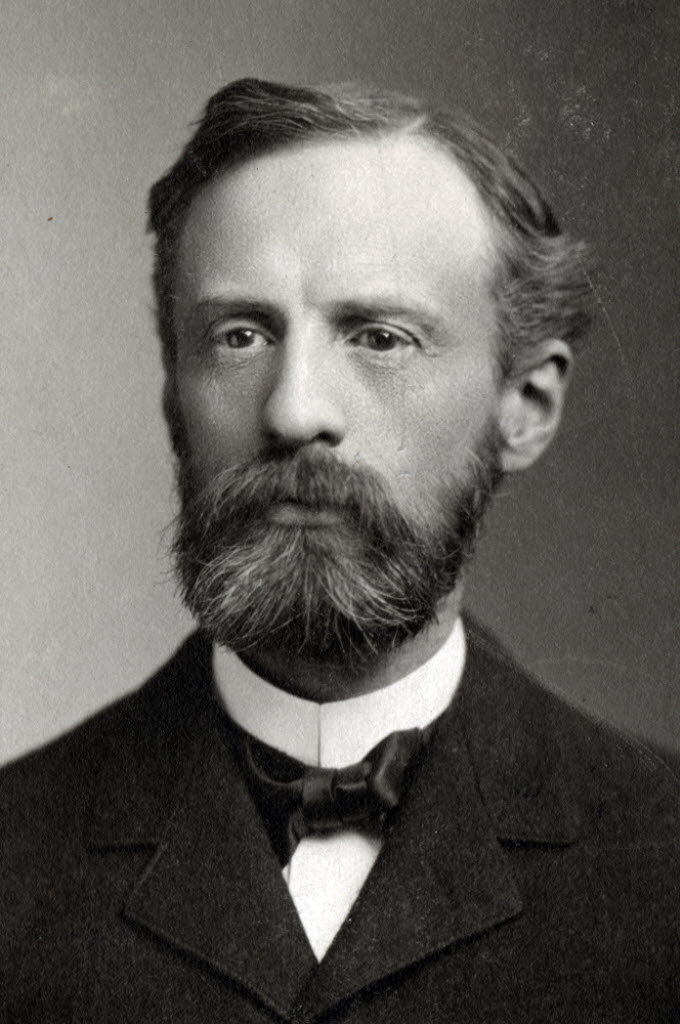

7th President of Western Reserve University
- In office 1921–1923
- Preceded by: Charles F. Thwing
- Succeeded by: Robert E. Vinson

Personal details
- Born: March 12, 1849 Cleveland, Ohio, U.S.
- Died: September 17, 1935 (aged 86) Cleveland, Ohio, U.S.
- Resting place: Lake View Cemetery, Cleveland, Ohio, U.S.
- Spouse: Edith Day Ely
- Education: Western Reserve; Union Theological Seminary

Rev. James DeLong Williamson (March 12, 1849 – September 17, 1935) was an American minister and the seventh President of Western Reserve University, now Case Western Reserve University.

Williamson married Edith Day Ely on August 4, 1875, and together had four children.

In 1909, he was the founding pastor of the Church of the Covenant.

Williamson served as acting president (1912-1915) and executive vice president (1915-1921, 1924-1927) while as Society for Savings Bank. In between, he was acting president of Western Reserve University, now Case Western Reserve University, from 1921 to 1923.

Williamson remained a trustee of Western Reserve University from 1905 until his death on September 17, 1935. He is buried in Lakeview Cemetery in Cleveland, OH.
