= John S. Millis =

American physicist and educator

10th President of Western Reserve University
- In office 1949–1967
- Preceded by: Winfred G. Leutner

14th President of the University of Vermont
- In office 1941–1949
- Preceded by: Guy W. Bailey
- Succeeded by: William S. Carlson

Personal details
- Born: November 22, 1903 Palo Alto, California, U.S.
- Died: January 1, 1988 (aged 84) Cleveland Heights, Ohio, U.S.
- Spouse: Katherine Roseberry Wisner
- Education: Chicago

John Schoff Millis (November 22, 1903 – January 1, 1988) was the tenth and last President of Western Reserve College, now Case Western Reserve University.

Millis was born in Palo Alto, California on November 22, 1903. He entered the University of Chicago at the age of 16, earning undergraduate degrees in mathematics and astronomy in 1924. He then received a master's degree in physics in 1927 and a doctoral degree in physics in 1931, studying under physicist Albert A. Michelson. On June 13, 1929, Millis married Katherine Roseberry Wisner of Baltimore, MD, and together they had three children.

Millis served as dean of Lawrence College in Wisconsin from 1936 to 1941. Millis served as president of the University of Vermont from 1941 to 1949. For the majority of his career, Millis held the position of president of Western Reserve University from 1947 under the federation with Case Institute of Technology in 1967. He served as Chancellor of the new Case Western Reserve University, where he retired on June 30, 1969. While in Cleveland, Millis helped organize the University Circle Development Foundation, predecessor to University Circle Incorporated (UCI). Millis died of cancer at his home in Cleveland Heights, Ohio, on January 1, 1988.

Academic offices
Preceded by Guy W. Bailey	President of the University of Vermont; 1941–1949	Succeeded by William S. Carlson
