= Robert W. Morse =

American academic administrator

1st President of Case Western Reserve University
- In office July 1, 1967 – July 1, 1970
- Succeeded by: Louis A. Toepfer

5th President of Case Institute of Technology
- In office September 1, 1966 – June 30, 1967
- Preceded by: T. Keith Glennan

Personal details
- Born: May 25, 1921
- Died: January 19, 2001 (aged 79)
- Education: Bowdoin College; Brown University
- Scientific career
- Fields: physics
- Workplaces: Brown University; Department of the Navy; Case Institute of Technology; Case Western Reserve University; Woods Hole Oceanographic Institution
- Thesis: The dispersion of compressional waves in isotropic rods of rectangular cross section (1949)

Dr. Robert Warren Morse (May 25, 1921 – January 19, 2001) was the first president of Case Western Reserve University, and the fifth and last president of Case Institute of Technology.

== Career ==
A native of Boston, Massachusetts, and a member of the class of 1943 at Bowdoin College, Morse served for 3 years in the U.S. Navy, rising to the rank of lieutenant. He received his master's degree in 1947 and PhD under R. Bruce Lindsay in physics in 1949 from Brown University. There he was a faculty member from 1946 to 1964. He became an assistant professor in 1949, a full professor in 1958, physics department head in 1960, and college dean in 1962.

In 1956, Morse took part in the National Academy of Sciences' Nobska Project, which was instrumental in the creation of the UGM-27 Polaris missile submarine. In 1964, he was named Assistant Secretary of the Navy (Research and Development) for the United States Navy. Dissatisfied with the United States' role in Vietnam, Morse left the Navy in 1966 to become president of the Case Institute of Technology. In 1967, Case merged with Western Reserve, with Morse becoming the first president of Case Western Reserve University. He remained there until 1971, when he left to become director of research at Woods Hole Oceanographic Institution where he retired in 1983. He helped to found Woods Hole's joint doctoral program with MIT. In 1999 a chair was endowed in his honor at Woods Hole.

Upon his death in 2001, Morse was survived by two sons, a daughter, and five grandchildren. His wife, Alice Cooper Morse, died in February 2000 after 57 years of marriage.

Government offices
| Preceded by James H. Wakelin Jr. | Assistant Secretary of the Navy (Research and Development); July 1, 1964 – June 30, 1966 | Succeeded by David S. Potter |
