= George Edmond Pierce =

American minister

George E. Pierce

2nd President of Western Reserve College
- In office 1834–1855
- Preceded by: Charles B. Storrs
- Succeeded by: Henry L. Hitchcock

Personal details
- Born: September 9, 1794 Southbury, Conn, U.S.
- Died: May 27, 1871 (aged 76) Hudson, Ohio, U.S.
- Resting place: Glendale Cemetery; Akron, Ohio, U.S.
- Education: Yale University; Andover Theological Seminary

Rev. George Edmond Pierce (September 9, 1794 – May 27, 1871) was an American minister and the second President of Western Reserve College, now Case Western Reserve University.

Pierce was born in Southbury, Conn, September 9, 1794. His father was Samuel Pierce, and his mother Martha, daughter of Robert Edmond, from Ireland. He graduated from Yale College in 1816. After graduation, he taught in Fairfield (Conn.) Academy for two years, and was for the next three years a member of Andover Theological Seminary. He was ordained pastor of the Congregational Church in Harwinton, Conn., July 10, 1822, and continued so until June 1834, when he was dismissed to accept the Presidency of the Western Reserve College, in Hudson, Ohio. He entered on his new duties in the next month, and remained in office twenty one years. In 1843, Pierce began the Medical Department of Western Reserve College, known today as the Case Western Reserve University School of Medicine. After his resignation his residence continued in Hudson, till his sudden death, May 27, 1871.

Dr. Pierce was married, December 1, 1824, to Miss Susan Rockwell, daughter of Martin Rockwell, of Colebrook, Conn., who survived him. They had five sons and one daughter: one son died in infancy, and three of the other sons graduated at Western Reserve College. Dr. Pierce received the degree of Doctor of Divinity from Middlebury College in 1838.

== Publications ==
- A plea for stability and permanence in institutions of learning: delivered before the trustees, officers, and students of the Cleveland Medical College, February 26, 1845
