= David V. Ragone =

American metallurgist and academic (1930–2023)

3rd President of Case Western Reserve University
- In office July 1, 1980 – June 30, 1987
- Preceded by: Louis A. Toepfer
- Succeeded by: Agnar Pytte

Personal details
- Born: May 16, 1930 New York City, New York, U.S.
- Died: March 20, 2023 (aged 92) Hingham, Massachusetts, U.S.
- Spouse: Katherine H. Spaulding
- Education: Massachusetts Institute of Technology
- Scientific career
- Fields: metallurgy
- Workplaces: University of Michigan; General Atomics; Carnegie Mellon University; Dartmouth College; Case Western Reserve University; Massachusetts Institute of Technology
- Thesis: Some factors affecting fluidity of metals (1953)

David Vincent Ragone (May 16, 1930 – March 20, 2023) was an American metallurgist, famous for the Ragone chart. He served the third president of Case Western Reserve University from 1980 to 1987 and the 9th dean of the University of Michigan College of Engineering from 1972 to 1980.

== Life and career ==
Ragone was born in New York City, New York, on May 16, 1930.

Ragone studied metallurgy at the Massachusetts Institute of Technology (MIT), where he earned a Bachelor of Science degree in 1951 and a Master of Science degree in 1952. In 1953, he graduated with a Ph.D. In the same year, he began teaching at the University of Michigan as an associate professor and later as a professor. He specialized in the fields of thermodynamics, chemical engineering, and metallurgy.

From 1962 to 1967 he worked with General Atomics, a subsidiary of the armaments company General Dynamics. There he was chairman of the department for material research. His research involved material investigations for the development of a gas-cooled nuclear reactor.

Ragone continued to teach metallurgy at a research university, this time at Carnegie Mellon University in Pittsburgh, Pennsylvania. After being a dean of the Thayer School of Engineering at Dartmouth College from 1970 to 1972, he eventually returned to the University of Michigan, where he was appointed Dean of Engineering.

From 1980 to 1987, Ragone served as President of Case Western Reserve University, a research university in the Cleveland, Ohio. In 1988, he moved back to his alma mater, MIT, where he taught thermodynamics and physical chemistry until 1998.

Ragone died in Hingham, Massachusetts on March 20, 2023, at the age of 92.

== Writings ==
- Thermodynamics of Materials (1995)
