= Louis A. Toepfer =

2nd President of Case Western Reserve University
- In office September 13, 1971 – June 30, 1980
- Preceded by: Robert W. Morse
- Succeeded by: David V. Ragone

acting President of Case Western Reserve University
- In office October 6, 1970 – September 12, 1971

Personal details
- Born: August 31, 1919 Sheboygan, Wisconsin
- Died: March 6, 2000 (aged 80) Saxtons River, Vermont
- Spouse: Alice Mary Willy
- Education: Beloit; Harvard Law School

Louis Adelbert Toepfer (August 31, 1919 – March 6, 2000) was the second President of Case Western Reserve University.

Toepfer was born in Sheboygan, Wisconsin on August 31, 1919.

Toepfer earned a Bachelor of Arts, magna cum laude, from Beloit College in 1940. He married his college sweetheart, Alice Mary Willy, in 1942. During World War II, he served as a Second Lieutenant in the U.S. Navy from 1942 to 1946, primarily on the USS Healy, a destroyer in the Pacific theater. In 1947, he graduated from Harvard Law School. Upon graduation, Toepfer became a member of Harvard Law School's faculty, and served as the school's vice dean from 1950 to 1966.

In 1966, Toepfer came to Case Western Reserve University as dean of the School of Law. He served as the second president of Case Western Reserve University from 1970 to 1980. Upon retirement, he joined the national law firm of Jones, Day, Reavis & Pogue as partner in charge of opening and managing the firm's new office in Columbus, Ohio.
