= Charles S. Howe =

American academic administrator (1858–1939)

2nd President of Case School of Applied Science
- In office 1902–1929
- Preceded by: Cady Staley
- Succeeded by: William E. Wickenden

Personal details
- Born: September 29, 1858 Nashua, New Hampshire, U.S.
- Died: April 18, 1939 (aged 80)
- Resting place: Glendale Cemetery, Akron, Ohio, U.S.
- Spouse: Abbie A. Waite
- Education: Massachusetts Agricultural College; College of Wooster

Charles Sumner Howe (September 29, 1858 – April 18, 1939) was the second president of Case School of Applied Science, now Case Western Reserve University.

Howe was born on September 29, 1858, in Nashua, New Hampshire. He earned his B.S. at both Massachusetts Agricultural College (now known as the University of Massachusetts Amherst) and Boston University in 1878 and his PhD from the College of Wooster in 1887.

As an initiate of Phi Sigma Kappa in 1876, he served as the first president of the Grand Chapter of Phi Sigma Kappa in 1878 while at its founding school of Massachusetts Agricultural College.

Howe served as principal of Longmeadow High School of Massachusetts in 1879. He moved west where he became the principal of the Academy of Albuquerque in New Mexico from 1879 to 1881, and was involved in mineral prospecting serving as an assayer for prospectors in Albuquerque until 1882.

Howe married Abbie A. Waite on May 22, 1882, and together had three children.

From 1883 to 1889, Howe served as the Professor of Mathematics and Astronomy at Buchtel College in Akron, Ohio. He went to Case School of Applied Science in 1889 where he was also Professor of Mathematics and Astronomy until 1902. Notably, Howe brought the first German-made Riefler clock, then considered the world's best, to America, with his own modifications making it the most accurate timepiece in the world. He maintained being the Kerr Professor of Mathematics at Case School of Applied Science from 1890 to 1908.

In 1902, Howe became the second president of Case School of Applied Science in Cleveland, Ohio, holding the office until 1929. During his tenure, he maintained a close relationship with influential Clevelanders, such as John D. Rockefeller, Worcester Warner, and Ambrose Swasey.

Howe served as the national president of the Society for the Promotion of Engineering Education (SPEE) from 1907 to 1908, known today as the American Society for Engineering Education (ASEE), and served civically as the president of the Cleveland Chamber of Commerce.

Howe is buried at Glendale Cemetery in Akron, Ohio.
