= Cady Staley =

American educator and university president

1st President of Case School of Applied Science
- In office 1886–1902
- Succeeded by: Charles S. Howe

Personal details
- Born: December 12, 1840 Minaville, Montgomery County, New York, U.S.
- Died: June 27, 1928 (aged 87) Amsterdam, New York
- Resting place: Chuctanunda Cemetery, Montgomery County, New York
- Spouse: Kate Holcomb (m. 1869)
- Education: Union College

Cady Staley (December 12, 1840 – June 27, 1928) was the first president of Case School of Applied Science, now Case Western Reserve University.

== Biography ==
Staley was born in Florida, Montgomery County, New York on December 12, 1840. He earned three degrees from Union College of Schenectady, New York, to include his B.A. (1865), C.E. (1866), and Ph.D. (1886). He worked at Union College as an instructor in Civil Engineering from 1867-1868, a professor of that subject from 1868-1876, and the Dean of the Faculty from 1876-1886.

He married Kate Holcomb on December 23, 1869. Staley also served as an engineer on the building of the Central Pacific Railroad.

In 1886, Staley became the first president of Case School of Applied Science in Cleveland, Ohio, holding the office until 1902. During and after his tenure, he also served as a professor of Civil Engineering, Political Economy, and Economics.

Staley died at his home in Amsterdam, New York on June 27, 1928.

== Writings ==
He was the author of:

- The Separate System of Sewerage (1886) with George Spencer Pierson
