= Glendale Cemetery =

Historic cemetery in Summit County, Ohio

- U.S. National Register of Historic Places
- U.S. Historic district
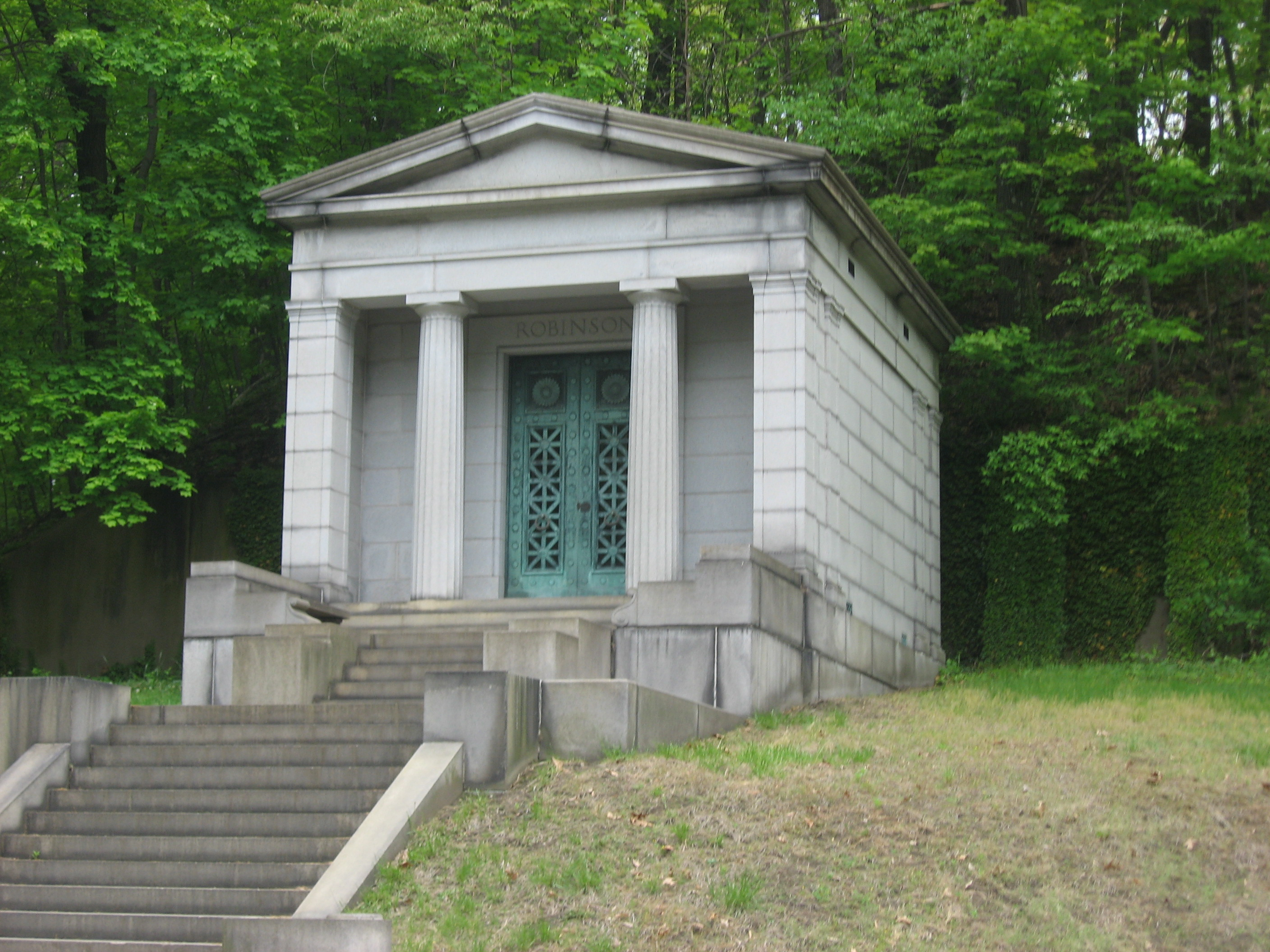
- A mausoleum on the main drive

- Location within Ohio Location within the United States
- Location: 150 Glendale Avenue; Akron, Ohio
- Coordinates: 41°05′05″N 81°31′41″W
- Area: 88 acres (36 ha)
- Built: 1839
- Architect: Albert Sargent; et al.
- Architectural style: Rural cemetery
- NRHP reference No.: 01001063
- Added to NRHP: September 28, 2001

Glendale Cemetery is a historic rural cemetery located in Akron, Ohio. It was added to the National Register of Historic Places in 2001.

== History ==
Glendale Cemetery was founded in 1839 by Dr. J.D. Commons. Here statues of prominent citizens, an avenue of stately mausoleums and a collection of headstones tell the story of Akron's past. Originally known as Akron Rural Cemetery, Commons modeled the design of the cemetery after Boston's Mount Auburn Cemetery, which he visited in 1838. Glendale is a picturesque romantic landscape with its curving roads, use of promontories to create vistas and a variety of architectural styles that draw upon ancient building forms. Mausoleums are modeled after Egyptian, Greek and Roman temples or Gothic churches. Nineteenth-century accounts described Glendale as "beautifully laid out in romantic drives and walks" and note its role as an area park and tourist destination.

Originally, the cemetery had a stream and two bodies of water—Willow and Swan Lakes. Due to the increased development surrounding the cemetery during the late 19th century, the natural spring that fed the lakes dried up. The superintendent of the cemetery at that time proposed running a pipe to the Ohio and Erie Canal to re-water the lakes, but this was never realized. Today the open space or Great Meadow recalls the scale of Swan Lake and several mausoleums have small foot bridges that once crossed over the stream fronting them. Distinct sections of the cemetery are devoted to the Masons, Akron's Jewish community and infants and children. The Civil War is prominently commemorated in Glendale Cemetery. The Buckley Post of the Union Army has a large memorial marker surrounded by 50 headstones located on the northern plateau. The 1876 Gothic Revival style Memorial Chapel was constructed by the Buckley Post and has been recently restored.

== Akron Rural Cemetery Buildings ==
- Akron Rural Cemetery Buildings
- U.S. National Register of Historic Places
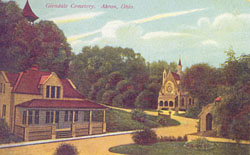
- Postcard showing buildings near the entrance
- Location: Akron, Ohio
- Architect: Frank O. Weary
- Architectural style: Gothic
- NRHP reference No.: 80003236
- Added to NRHP: 1980-09-27

The cemetery holds the Akron Rural Cemetery Buildings, a registered historic site, listed in the National Register on 1980-09-27. They are credited to prominent Akron architect Frank O. Weary. The four buildings are:

- The Memorial Chapel, built in 1876 as an American Civil War monument and was erected by Buckley Post #12 Grand Army of the Republic.
- The Bell Tower, built in 1883
- The Caretakers Lodge, built in 1869
- The Office, built in 1903

== Notable interments ==
- Ohio Columbus Barber (1841–1920), industrialist and philanthropist; founder of the Barber Match Company and Barberton, Ohio
- Ellsworth Bathrick (1863–1917), US Congressman
- John Buchtel (1820–1892), businessman and founder of Buchtel College, the predecessor of the University of Akron
- Gilbert S. Carpenter (1836–1904), US Army brigadier general
- George Washington Crouse (1832–1912), US Congressman
- Charles W.F. Dick (1858–1945), US Senator
- Charles S. Howe (1858–1939), 2nd President of Case School of Applied Science (present-day Case Western Reserve University)
- Lewis Miller.(1829–1899), philanthropist and inventor
- Julia Perry (1927–1979), composer, conductor, and educator
- George Edmond Pierce (1794–1871), 2nd President of Western Reserve College (present-day Case Western Reserve University)
- Frank Seiberling (1859–1955), early 20th century industrialist; founder of the Goodyear Tire and Rubber Company and the Seiberling Rubber Company.
- John F. Seiberling (1918–2008), US Congressman and grandson of Goodyear founder F.A. Seiberling
- William Hanford Upson (1823–1910), 19th century politician, lawyer, and judge
- Alvin C. Voris (1827–1904), Union colonel and Ohio state representative
