= William E. Wickenden =

American college president (1882–1947)

William W. Wickenden

3rd President of Case School of Applied Science
- In office 1929–1947
- Preceded by: Charles S. Howe
- Succeeded by: T. Keith Glennan

Personal details
- Born: December 24, 1882 Toledo, Ohio, U.S.
- Died: September 1, 1947 (aged 64) Peterborough, New Hampshire, U.S.
- Spouse: Marion Lamb
- Education: Denison University

William Elgein Wickenden (December 24, 1882 – September 1, 1947) was the third president of Case School of Applied Science, now Case Western Reserve University.

Wickenden was born in Toledo, Ohio, on December 24, 1882. He graduated from Denison University in 1904 and married Marion Lamb, also a Denison graduate, in Toledo on Sept 2, 1908.

He began his teaching career in higher education, first at Rochester Athenaeum and Mechanics Institute in 1904, then at the University of Wisconsin from 1905 to 1909, and finally at the Massachusetts Institute of Technology from 1909 to 1918. From 1918 to 1921, he was Personnel Director of the Western Electric Company, was appointed Assistant Vice President of the American Telephone and Telegraph Company (AT&T) in 1921.

Through his connections from MIT and producing technical survey work at AT&T, Wickenden was recruited by the Society for the Promotion of Engineering Education (SPEE), now known as American Society for Engineering Education (ASEE), to be the Director of the Investigation of Engineering Education. Primarily, he was tasked to conduct the most thorough survey to date, outlining American technical manpower needs and educational means to achieve them. In conjunction with the Carnegie Corporation, United States Bureau of Education, Eta Kappa Nu, and national engineering societies, the study lasted six years and 150 schools. The Wickenden Report, Report of the Investigation of Engineering Education 1923-1929 was released in two segments–volume 1 in 1930 and volume 2 in 1934. Wickenden later served as the national president of the Society for the Promotion of Engineering Education (SPEE) from 1933 to 1934.

In 1929, Wickenden became the third president of Case School of Applied Science. Immediately, he had to deal with the onset of the Great Depression, working hard to keep the university solvent during the 1930s. Previously, Case had only offered undergraduate degree. Wickenden added multiple graduate degree programs where the school's first master's and doctoral degrees were earned under his watch. In 1947, Wickenden oversaw the name change transition of Case School of Applied Science to Case Institute of Technology.

He was also a member of Sigma Chi, Phi Beta Kappa, and Sigma Xi. Additionally, he was president of the American Institute of Electrical Engineers (AIEE), from 1945 to 1946. Honorary degrees bestowed upon him are: Doctor of Engineering, Lafayette College, 1926, Worcester Polytechnic Institute, 1927, Case School of Applied Science, 1929, and Rose Polytechnic Institute, 1932; Doctor of Science, Denison University, 1928, and Bucknell University, 1930; Doctor of Laws, Oberlin College, 1930; and Doctor of Humane Letters, Otterbein College, 1933.

Wickenden died of a heart attack at Monadnock Community Hospital on September 1, 1947, while on vacation at Peterborough, New Hampshire.

== Writings ==
He was the author of:

- Illumination and Photometry (1910)
- Report of the Investigation of Engineering Education 1923-1929. Volume 1 (1930) with Chas. F. Scott.
- Report of the Investigation of Engineering Education 1923-1929. Volume 2 (1934) with Chas. F. Scott.
- Engineering Education Needs a "Second Mile." Electrical Engineering. Volume: 54 Issue: 5 (May 1935)
