= Robert Alfano =

Italian-American experimental physicist

Robert R. Alfano
- Citizenship: United States
- Education: Fairleigh Dickinson University; 1963 – B.S. (Physics); 1964 – M.S. (Physics); New York University; 1972 – Ph.D. (Physics)
- Known for: Biomedical Optics; Biophysics; Ultrafast Spectroscopy; Optics and Photonics
- Awards: SPIE Gold Medal (2019)
- Scientific career
- Fields: Physics
- Institutions: CUNY Graduate School; GTE Labs
- Notable students: Anthony M. Johnson

Robert Alfano is an Italian-American experimental physicist. He is a Distinguished Professor of Science and Engineering at the City College and the Graduate School of the City University of New York, where he is also the founding director of the Institute for Ultrafast Spectroscopy and Lasers (1982). He is a pioneer in the fields of Biomedical Imaging and Spectroscopy, Ultrafast lasers and optics, tunable lasers, semiconductor materials and devices, optical materials, biophysics, nonlinear optics and photonics; he has also worked extensively in nanotechnology and coherent backscattering. His discovery of the white-light supercontinuum laser is at the root of optical coherence tomography, which is breaking barriers in ophthalmology, cardiology, and oral cancer detection (see "Better resolution with multibeam OCT," page 28) among other applications. He initiated the field known now as optical biopsy.

Alfano's contributions to photonics are documented in more than 700 research articles, 102 patents, several edited volumes and conference proceedings, and well over 10,000 citations. He holds 45 patents and published over 230 articles in the area of biomedical optics. Alfano has trained and mentored over 52 PhD candidates and 50 post-doctoral students. For the past ten years, he has trained many high school students in hands on photonics.

== A pioneer in biomedical optics ==
Alfano has made a number of original contributions to biomedical optics for the use of light for noninvasive detection and diagnosis of diseases; in particular, cancers and atherosclerosis. His innovative application of fluorescence, excitation, Raman, and Stokes Shift Spectroscopic techniques to distinguish between normal and cancerous tissues, as well as benign and normal tumors of human body, was the basis for the creation of the field known as optical biopsy.

His contributions to the fundamentals of light propagation in turbid media led to the development of different gating techniques for sorting out image-bearing photons for direct imaging of structures within biological tissues. He helped lead the development of many of these photon-sorting techniques; he also leads a major effort dedicated to the development of three-dimensional inverse image reconstruction techniques using a sequence of time-resolved two-dimensional images for optical mammography.

Alfano demonstrated the potential application of optical spectroscopy in the diagnosis of disease, which then opened up the field of optical biopsy in 1984. In fact, he introduced the term "optical biopsy."

In 1981 Alfano used fluorescence spectroscopy and time-resolved kinetics to detect cavities in human teeth. In 1984, he was the first to detect cancer using the native fluorescence spectroscopy of tissue without extrinsic dyes. In a series of experiments, his group demonstrated that these spectroscopic techniques have the potential to provide the diagnostic ability to distinguish between normal tissues and tumors, as well as between malignant and benign tumors. A major breakthrough was his use of near-ultraviolet and blue light for excitation of proteins and amino acids in tissues, and recognition of the ratio of peak fluorescence intensities emitted by biological tissues at two wavelengths (such as the 340 nm peak associated with tryptophan and the 440 nm peak associated with NADH) as a parameter for identification of the tissue as normal or cancerous. This observation has enabled noninvasive detection of cancer based on fluorescence ratio, and obtaining a fluorescence ratio map to identify a suspect region of a body organ as normal, precancerous, or cancerous with high sensitivity and specificity over 90%. His research group was the first to use Raman spectroscopy, starting in 1991, to diagnose cancers in human breast tissue. He was pioneer to conduct ultrafast time-resolved techniques in picosecond ranges to study fluorescence polarization dynamics of dye in tissue and/or scattering media. Recently, he demonstrated to use Stokes shift spectroscopy as an efficient way to rapidly measure spectral fingerprints of multiple key fluorophores related to carcinogenesis in tissue as complex mixtures and highlights the differences between cancerous and normal tissues.

A detailed understanding of light propagation through highly scattering turbid media (which is what biological tissue is), is crucial to the development of optical biomedical imaging techniques. Alfano carried out concerted experimental and theoretical investigations to address the issue. The work by his group led to the development of the concept and elucidation of the properties of ballistic, snake, and diffusive photons based on the time of flight of photons within the media. He introduced the terms ballistic and snake photons, and identified these photons as carriers of information for direct shadowgram imaging. Comprehending of the characteristics of these photons led to the development of various gating techniques for sorting out image-bearing photons for direct two-dimensional imaging of inhomogeneities in turbid media in general, and biomedical samples in particular.

In addition to his technical contributions, Alfano has encouraged the growth of the field by organizing topical meetings and conferences for OSA and SPIE, and later co-chairing many optical imaging conferences with Britton Chance, whereby he introduced young scientists and engineers to biomedical optics, and attracted other researchers to the field.

== Career ==
In addition to his faculty position as a Distinguished Professor at the City College and Graduate School of New York, Alfano has held, or currently holds, a number of directorship positions:

- City College of New York 2004– Director of DOD Center for Nanoscale Photonic Emitters and Sensors
- City College of New York 2003–2007 Director of NASA Center of Optical Sensing and Imaging
- City College of New York 2003–2006 Director of NYS Center for Advanced Technology in Photonic Applications
- City College of New York 1993–2003 Director of NYS Center for Advanced Technology in Ultrafast Photonics
- City College of New York 1998–2002 Director of DOE Center for Laser Imaging and Cancer Diagnostics
- City College of New York 1994–2002 Director of NASA IRA Program on Tunable Solid State Lasers and Optical Imaging
- City College of New York 1987–current, Director of the Mediphotonics Laboratory
- City College of New York 1985–2007 Director of the Photonic Application Laboratory
- City College of New York 1982–current, Director of the Institute for Ultrafast Spectroscopy and Lasers
- City College of New York 1974–1981 Director of the Picosecond Laser and Spectroscopy Laboratory

== Academic background and early career ==
Alfano attended Fairleigh Dickinson University and continued at FDU to earn his master's degree. After graduating, he submitted an application for employment to General Telephone and Electronics (GTE) Laboratories, now Verizon (at that time the competitor nipping at the heels of Bell Telephone), and received a rejection letter. Simultaneously, he sent a letter to Sylvania, a General Telephone subsidiary. The interviewer was impressed with Alfano's knowledge of physics, and called upon Dr. Esther Conwell, a well-known solid-state theorist at GTE, to complete the interview. Conwell recognized his understanding of quantum mechanics and feel for physics concepts. The company offered him a position; and he later ended up getting the job for which he had been rejected, working for Conwell.

At GTE Alfano found a good "home" for his own work and some professional support, which included important colleagues, like Stanley Shapiro, Joseph Birman, and Alexander Lempicki. Early on, while working on optical phonon lifetimes, the basis for his doctoral thesis, he accidentally discovered the white-light supercontinuum laser. "I thought there was something wrong with the experiment," he said. "For three months I worked to find the source of my error, because what I was seeing just didn't seem possible."

Alfano left GTE because the company reorganized and relocated, breaking up his team. He moved to the City University of New York. At the suggestion of then-provost Harry Lustig, he founded and became the director of the Institute for Ultrafast Spectroscopy and Lasers (IUSL). Since its launch in 1983, IUSL has grown to become a major academic center for biomedical optics research.

== Awards ==
SPIE Gold Medal, 2019 for "the application and understanding of high-speed physical phenomena, including the development of new technologies as well as new applications of existing technologies"

Michael S. Feld Biophotonics Award in 2016 "For leadership and pioneering contributions in the field of biophotonics, comprising the diverse use of label-free native fluorescence, Raman spectroscopy, and optical imaging for cancer detection in tissues and cells.

American Physical Society Arthur Schawlow Award in 2013 for Laser Science for pioneering contributions to the field of ultrafast laser science, including the discovery of supercontinuum generation and new laser materials, as well as the study of pulse propagation in strongly scattering media

OSA Charles Townes Award 2008 for contributions to the discovery and investigation of supercontinuum generation and the development of tetravalent chromium-based tunable solid state lasers, specifically the Forsterite, Emerald, and CUNYITE (named for City University of New York) lasers.

Britton Chance Biomedical Optics Award in 2012, honoring his pioneering contributions to optical methods for biology or medicine.

Coherent Lifetime Achievement Award in Biomedical Optics in 2002

Fellow, the American Physical Society (APS),

Fellow, Optical Society (OSA),

Fellow, New York Academy of Sciences

Fellow, Institute of Electrical and Electronics Engineers (IEEE)

Fellow, the International Society for Optics and Photonics (SPIE).

== Sample publications ==
- Alfano, R. R (1989). The supercontinuum laser source (PDF).
- Alfano, Robert R (2010-10-29). The Supercontinuum Laser Source: Fundamentals with Updated References. Springer. ISBN 978-1-4419-2032-4.
- Alfano, R. R (1982). Biological Events Probed by Ultrafast Laser Spectroscopy. Elsevier. ISBN 978-0-323-14958-7.* Reyes, SM; Nolan, DA; Shi, L; Alfano, RR (2020). "Special classes of optical vector vortex beams are Majorana-like photons". Optics Communications. 464 (1) 125425. Bibcode:2020OptCo.46425425R. doi:10.1016/j.optcom.2020.125425. S2CID 213970008.
- Alfano, R. R (1985). Semiconductors Probed by Ultrafast Laser Spectroscopy. Elsevier. ISBN 978-0-323-14546-6.
- Pu, Y; Wang, W. B; Yang, Y. L; Alfano, R. R (2012). "Stokes shift spectroscopy highlights differences of cancerous and normal human tissues". Opt. Lett. 37 (16): 3360–3362. Bibcode:2012OptL...37.3360P. doi:10.1364/OL.37.003360. PMID 23381257.
- Alfano, RR; Das, BB; Cleary, J; Prudente, R; Celmer, EJ (1991). "Light sheds light on cancer—distinguishing malignant tumors from benign tissues and tumors". Bulletin of the New York Academy of Medicine. 67 (2): 143–150. PMC 1809828. PMID 2049567.
- Pu, Y; Achilefu, S; Alfano, RR (2013). "Smart beacons target cancer tumor". BioOptics World. 6 (4): 28–33.
- Mamani, S; Nolan, DA; Shi, L; Alfano, RR (2020). "Special classes of optical vector vortex beams are Majorana-like photons". Optics Communications. 464 (1) 125425. Bibcode:2020OptCo.46425425R. doi:10.1016/j.optcom.2020.125425. S2CID 213970008.
