= Winfred G. Leutner =

9th President of Western Reserve University
- In office 1933–1949
- Preceded by: Robert E. Vinson
- Succeeded by: John S. Millis

Personal details
- Born: March 1, 1879 Cleveland, Ohio, U.S.
- Died: December 25, 1961 (aged 82) Westlake, Ohio, U.S.
- Resting place: Lake View Cemetery, Cleveland, Ohio, U.S.
- Spouse: Emily Payne Smith
- Children: Frederick S. Leutner; Mary Willett; Ruth Gantz
- Education: Western Reserve; Johns Hopkins

Winfred George Leutner (March 1, 1879 – December 25, 1961) was the ninth President of Western Reserve University, now Case Western Reserve University.

Leutner was born March 1, 1879, in Cleveland, Ohio. In 1901, he graduated from Western Reserve's Adelbert College, now Case Western Reserve University. Leutner continued his education at Johns Hopkins University, earning his master's degree in 1903 and Ph.D. in 1905. From 1907 to 1908 he studied overseas at the American School of Classical Studies at Athens and Rome. Leutner was a member of Phi Beta Kappa and Beta Theta Pi. He married Emily Payne Smith in 1910, together having three children.

Leutner served as an instructor of Greek at Western Reserve's Flora Stone Mather College and Adelbert College in 1904. From 1905 to 1906, he was assistant professor of Greek at Wittenberg College, before returning to Adelbert College as an instructor of Latin and Greek in 1906. He again became instructor of Greek and Latin at Adelbert College from 1909 to 1915, becoming a full professor in 1915. In 1912 he became dean of Adelbert College, and in 1925 dean of university administration. Leutner helped establish Cleveland College, the downtown adult education college, where he was acting director from 1925 to 1926.

In 1933 Leutner became the ninth president of Western Reserve University, serving until 1949.

Leutner died on Christmas Day in Westlake, Ohio, on December 25, 1961. He is buried in Lakeview Cemetery in Cleveland, OH.
