= Adelbert Hall =

- U.S. National Register of Historic Places
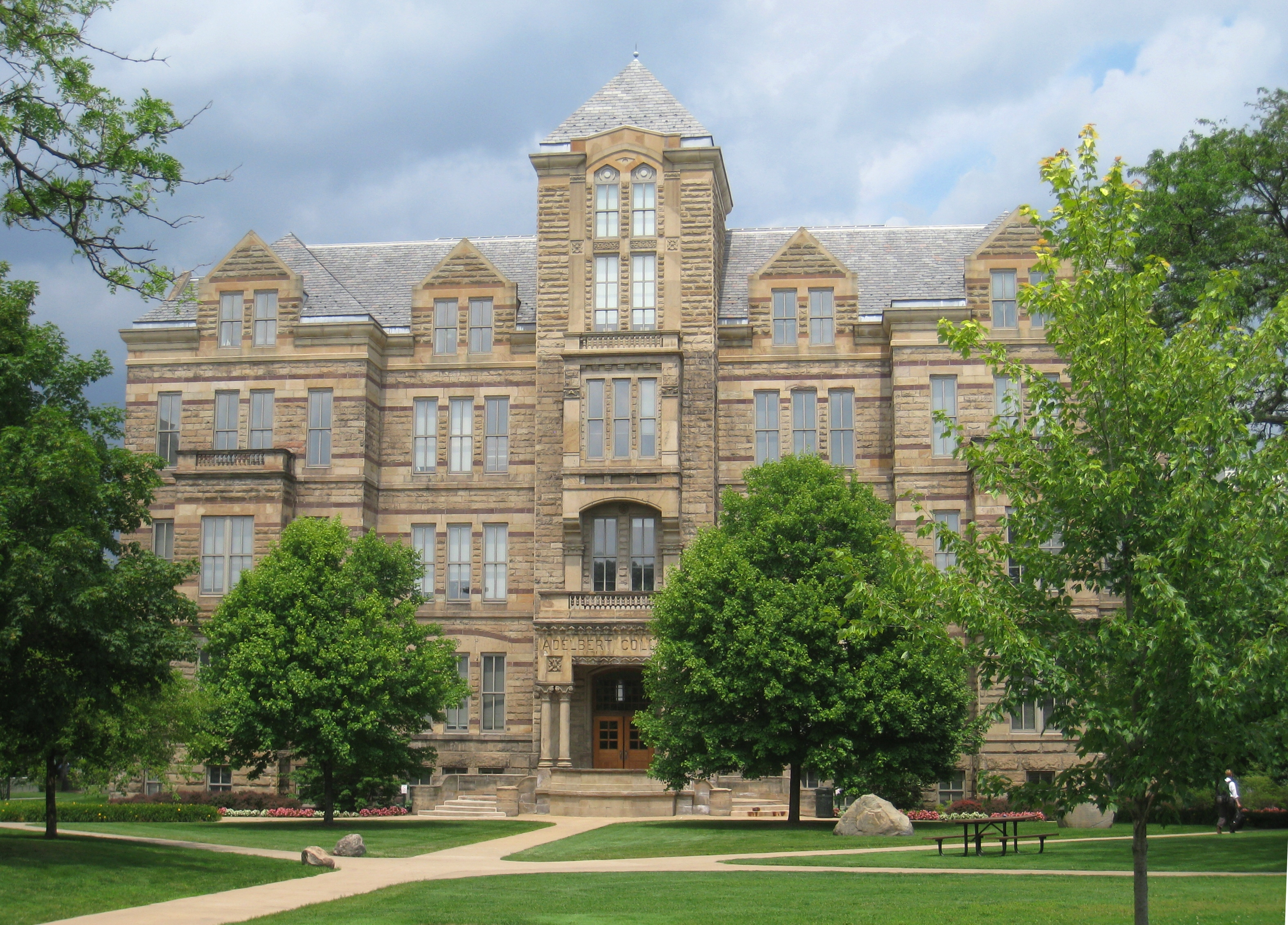
- Adelbert Hall

- Location within Cleveland Location within Ohio Location within the United States
- Location: Cleveland, Ohio
- Coordinates: 41°30′17″N 81°36′30″W
- Architect: Joseph Ireland
- Architectural style: Italianate, Stick-Eastlake and Romanesque
- NRHP reference No.: 73001405
- Added to NRHP: October 30, 1973

Adelbert Hall is an administration building at Case Western Reserve University in Cleveland, Ohio, and a registered historic building, listed in the National Register on October 30, 1973.

== Construction ==
It was built in 1881 to serve as the home of Western Reserve College and named after Adelbert Stone, the son of industrialist Amasa Stone. The building was gutted by a fire in June 1991, and a $12.4 million restoration of the building was completed in 1993 during the tenure of President Agnar Pytte.
