= Charles Franklin Thwing =

American pastor and educator (1853–1937)

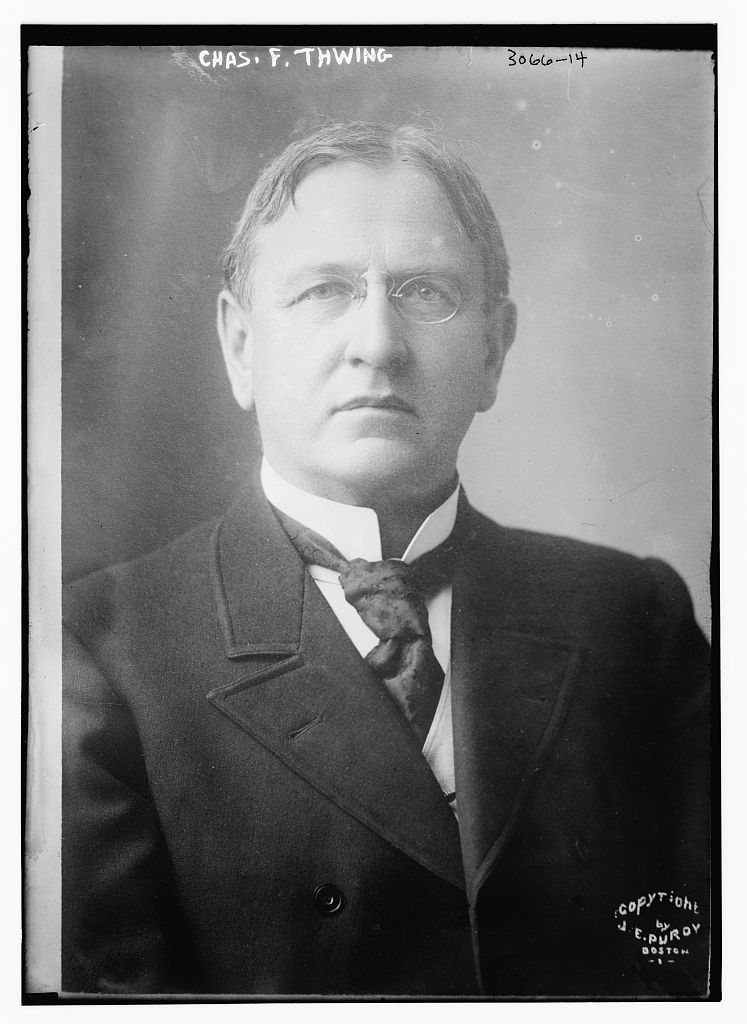
- Thwing, c. 1910–1915

6th President of Western Reserve University
- In office 1890–1921
- Preceded by: Hiram C. Haydn
- Succeeded by: James D. Williamson

Personal details
- Born: November 9, 1853 New Sharon, Maine, U.S.
- Died: August 29, 1937 (aged 83) Cleveland, Ohio, U.S.
- Resting place: Lake View Cemetery, Cleveland, Ohio, U.S. 41.5119°N 81.5928°W
- Education: Harvard University; Andover Theological Seminary

Rev. Charles Franklin Thwing (November 9, 1853 – August 29, 1937) was an American clergyman and educator.

== Birth ==
He was born in New Sharon, Maine on November 9, 1853. He graduated from Harvard University in 1876, and from Andover Theological Seminary in 1879. He then served as a pastor in churches in Cambridge, Massachusetts and Minneapolis, Minnesota. The Reverend Thwing became president of Adelbert College and Western Reserve University in Cleveland, Ohio. In 1899, as president of Western Reserve, he signed a petition to President William McKinley to mediate the conflict between Great Britain and the Transvaal and the Orange Free State. In 1909 was a member of the National Negro Committee, the precursor to the NAACP. He was an active supporter of the new NAACP from 1909 through at least 1929. He died on August 29, 1937.

== Writings ==
He was the author of:

- The Reading of Books (1883)
- The Family (1886; second edition, 1913), with Carrie F. Butler Thwing
- Within College Walls (1893)
- The College Woman (1894)
- College Administration (1900)
- God In His World (1900)
- If I Were a College Student (1902)
- History of Higher Education in America (1906)
- Education in the Far East (1909)
- A History of Education the United States since the Civil War (1910)
- Universities of the World (1911)
- Letters from a Father to his Son Entering College (1912)
- Letters from a Father to His Daughter Entering College (1913)
- The American College (1913)
- The College Gateway (1918)
- Human Australasia: Studies of Society and Education in Australia and New Zealand (1923)
- Guides, Philosophers, and Friends Studies of College Men (1927)
- The College President (1929)
- The American and the German University: one Hundred Years of History (1928)
- American Society: Interpretations of Educational and Other Forces (1931)
