= Anthony M. Johnson =

American physicist, ultrafast optics (born 1954)

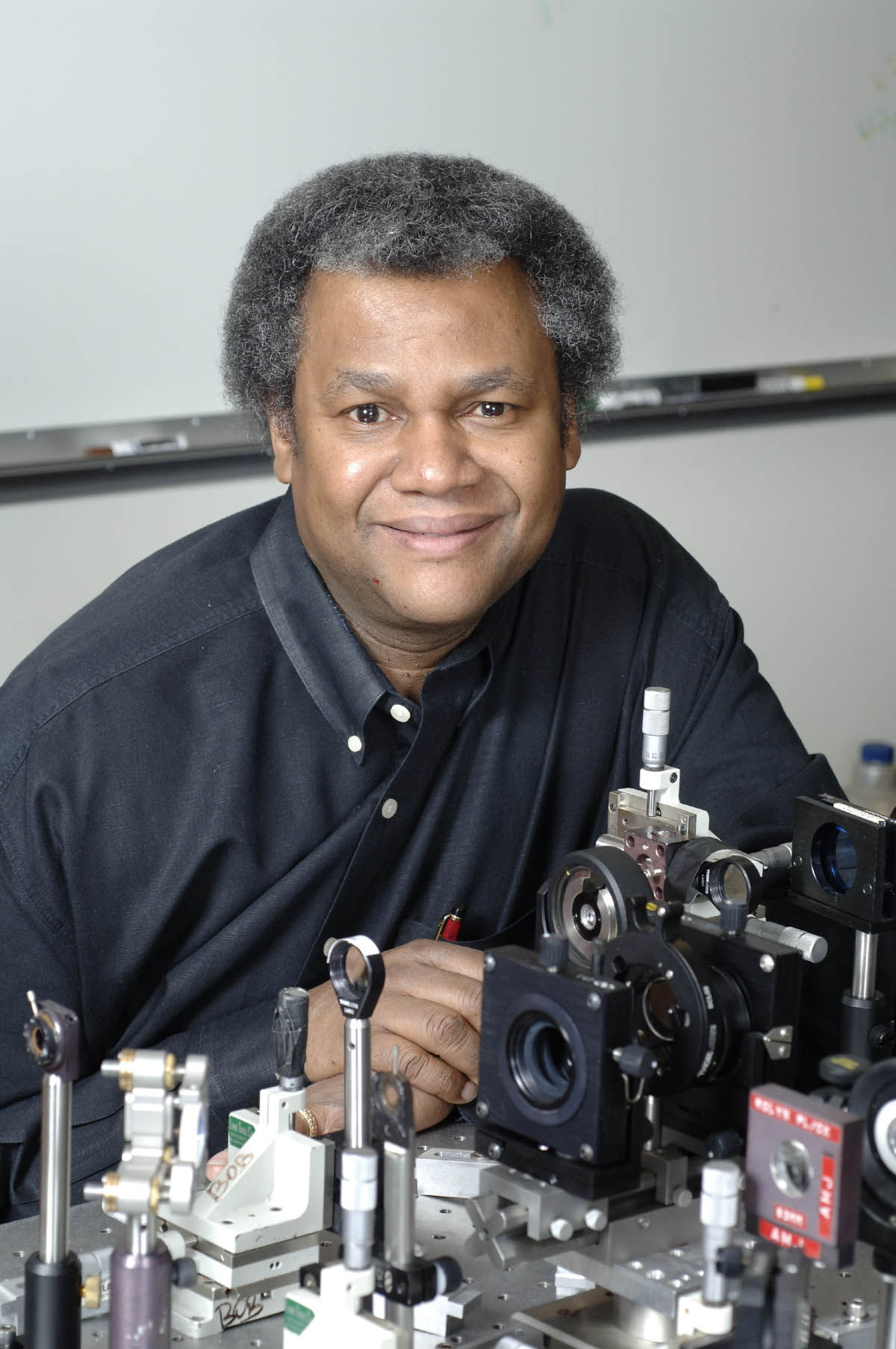
- Born: May 23, 1954 (age 72); Brooklyn, New York, U.S.
- Education: Polytechnic Institute of New York (BS); City College of the City University of New York (PhD)
- Known for: Ultrafast optics and optoelectronics
- Scientific career
- Fields: Physics, electrical engineering
- Workplaces: University of Maryland, Baltimore County; New Jersey Institute of Technology; Bell Labs
- Doctoral advisors: David H. Auston; Robert Alfano

Anthony Michael Johnson is an American experimental physicist, a professor of physics, and a professor of computer science and electrical engineering at the University of Maryland, Baltimore County (UMBC). He is the director of the Center for Advanced Studies in Photonics Research (CASPR), also situated on campus at UMBC. Since his election to the 2002 term as president of the Optical Society, formerly the Optical Society of America, Johnson has the distinction of being the first and only African-American president to date. Johnson's research interests include the ultrafast photophysics and nonlinear optical properties of bulk, nanostructured, and quantum well semiconductor structures, ultrashort pulse propagation in fibers and high-speed lightwave systems. His research has helped to better understand processes that occur in ultrafast time frames of 1 quadrillionth of a second. Ultrashort pulses of light have been used to address technical and logistical challenges in medicine, telecommunications, homeland security, and have many other applications that enhance contemporary life.

Johnson also serves as the deputy director and materials research thrust leader for the National Science Foundation (NSF) Engineering Research Center for Mid-Infrared Technologies for Health and the Environment, or MIRTHE, established in 2006. Headquartered at Princeton University, it is a collaboration of physicists, engineers, chemists, environmental and bio-engineers, and clinicians from City College of New York, Johns Hopkins University, Rice University, Texas A&M University, and UMBC.

== Early life and education ==
Johnson was born in Brooklyn, New York, the first of three sons for his blue-collar parents. His middle-class beginnings did not prepare him for a career in science, until his parents gave him a small chemistry set for Christmas. After he "nearly blew up the family home making gunpowder in the basement", he was completely captivated by the enabling power of science, and he thought he could be the first in his family to attend college. Johnson knew he wanted to pursue a STEM career, and he decided to study physics when his high school physics teacher took a special interest in him, and encouraged him to focus his efforts on the uber science. Johnson decided to attend the same college that his high school physics teacher attended, and he graduated with a B.S. in physics from the Polytechnic Institute of New York in 1975. That same evening, he was married in a small ceremony at his fiancée's home. Johnson went on to earn a Ph.D. in physics in 1981 from the Graduate Center at the City College of the City University of New York (CCNY). His PhD thesis research was conducted at AT&T Bell Laboratories in Murray Hill, New Jersey, with support from the Bell Labs Cooperative Research Fellowship Program for Minorities (CRFP). Johnson's doctoral thesis research was advised by David H. Auston (formerly Bell Labs) and Robert Alfano (CCNY).

== Career and service ==
Prior to being recruited for his position as director of UMBC's newest center, CASPR, in 2003, Johnson was the chairperson and distinguished professor of applied physics at the New Jersey Institute of Technology from 1995 to 2003. Before that, he was a member of technical staff in the quantum physics and electronics department from 1981 to 1988, and was promoted to distinguished member of technical staff in the photonics circuits research department at AT&T Bell Laboratories (Holmdel, New Jersey) from 1988 to 1995.

A significant part of Johnson's professional activities is dedicated to advancing the science careers of minorities and women both in the United States and developing countries. He co-founded The Optical Society’s Ad Hoc committee on Women and Minorities in Optics (88–93); served as chair of the American Physical Society's (APS) Committee on Minorities in Physics (92–93); was co-chair of the Optical Society's Committee on Women and Minorities in Optics (94–98); serves on the Steering Committee of the APS Minority Bridge Program; is The Optical Society rep to the American Institute of Physics' Liaison Committee for Underrepresented Minorities. Johnson spearheads countless committees on diversity, and speaks extensively on the subject around the world. He is a co-contributing editor of Reflections in Diversity in Optics and Photonics News, and has written several papers on issues related to minority participation for the magazine. Johnson proudly operates his research lab at UMBC primarily with students from underrepresented groups in STEM (Science-Technology-Engineering-Mathematics) programs. In 2020, Johnson joined the Optica Diversity, Equity & Inclusion Rapid Action Committee that charged with developing recommendations for our corporate and program divisions to support and increase black scientists and engineers within the optics and photonics community.

Johnson is committed to enhancing science education for young elementary students as well, and participates in many extracurricular youth experiences. One example of these efforts is reflected in his being the principal investigator of the $1.7 million NSF Informal Science Education Grant entitled 'Hands-On Optics: Making an Impact with Light.' This program targets middle school students and is designed to inspire an interest in technology by bringing optics-related activities into after-school science programs. The partners are The Optical Society, SPIE, MESA and NOAO. In his state of the art laser lab at CASPR he has hosted Girl Scouts, local elementary school students, Meyerhoff scholars, and politicians alike.

Johnson has authored approximately 100 refereed papers, two book chapters, and holds four U.S. patents. He provides unceasing service to the optics community as an active member of a number of professional organizations and scientific commissions. His roles have included: editor-in-chief of Optics Letters; member the board of editors, board of directors and served as president of The Optical Society in 2002; member of the National Research Council's Committee on Atomic, Molecular, and Optical Science, and the board on Assessment of NIST Programs; member of the governing boards of the American Institute of Physics, and the Institute of Electrical and Electronics Engineers (IEEE) Lasers & Electro-Optics Society (LEOS), and the executive board of American Physical Society (APS), and a member of the U.S. Department of Energy's Basic Energy Sciences Advisory Committee. He is a member of the American Association of Physics Teachers [AAPT], and the African Scientific Institute. He has also served on the program committees for the Conference on Lasers and Electro-Optics (CLEO), which he co-chaired in 1996, and the program committee for the LEOS Annual Meeting.

== Awards and honors ==
- Sigma Xi Undergraduate Research Award
- AT&T Bell Labs Research Area Affirmative Action Award
- Distinguished Alumnus Award from Polytechnic University
- Charter Fellow of the National Society of Black Physicists [NSBP]
- 1988 AT&T Bell Labs Distinguished Technical Staff Award
- 1991 Fellow of The Optical Society [OSA]
- 1994 Black Engineer of the Year Special Recognition Award
- 1995 Fellow of the American Physical Society [APS] "For his contributions to ultrafast optoelectronics and nonlinear optics, including high speed semiconductor sampling gates, optical pulse compression and tunable ultrafast laser sources."
- 1996 APS Edward A. Bouchet Award "For his pioneering contributions to nonlinear optics, lasers, and optoelectronics; for his leadership in the national scientific community; and for his many efforts to attract minorities to careers in science and engineering."
- 1996 Fellow of the American Association for the Advancement of Science [AAAS]
- 2000 Fellow of the Institute of Electrical and Electronics Engineers [IEEE] "For contributions to ultrafast optoelectronics and nonlinear optics."
- 2005 Science Spectrum magazine's Trailblazer Top Minority in Science Award
- 2011 Honorary Degree, Doctor of Science, honoris causa, from the CCNY
- 2021 OSA Stephen D. Fantone Distinguished Service Award "For decades of principled leadership and steadfast service to The Optical Society and to the optics community, and especially for serving as a tireless ambassador for OSA"

== International activities ==
Johnson's professional duties require him to travel quite a bit. Some examples of these include:

- Recruiter, international students, department of physics, NJIT, Beijing/Harbin, China
- Visiting lecturer, Indian Institute of Technology (IIT), Kanpur, India
- Visiting lecturer, Winter College in Optics, Dakar, Senegal
- International coordinator (USA), African Laser Atomic & Molecular Sciences Network, Senegal
- Member of the executive board, International Centre on Theoretical Physics (ICTP), Trieste, Italy
- Invited speaker to professional conferences worldwide, including events in Ghana, Benin, Brazil, Mexico, Canada, South Africa, Russia, Australia, Austria, England, and others.

== Personal life ==
Johnson's mother was a buyer for a major department store, and his father worked for the New York City Transit Authority as a bus driver. His uncle and both his brothers also have careers with the transit authority, and when he was very young, Johnson considered he too would pursue the same line of work. A high school physics teacher changed his life forever. He is married to Adrienne, who has a doctorate in education from Columbia University, and is a former college professor turned writer. They have three adult children together.

== See also ==
- Optical Society Past Presidents of the OSA
- American Physical Society
- National Society of Black Physicists
- University of Maryland, Baltimore County
- American Institute of Physics
