= Thomas Day Seymour =

19th-century American classicist

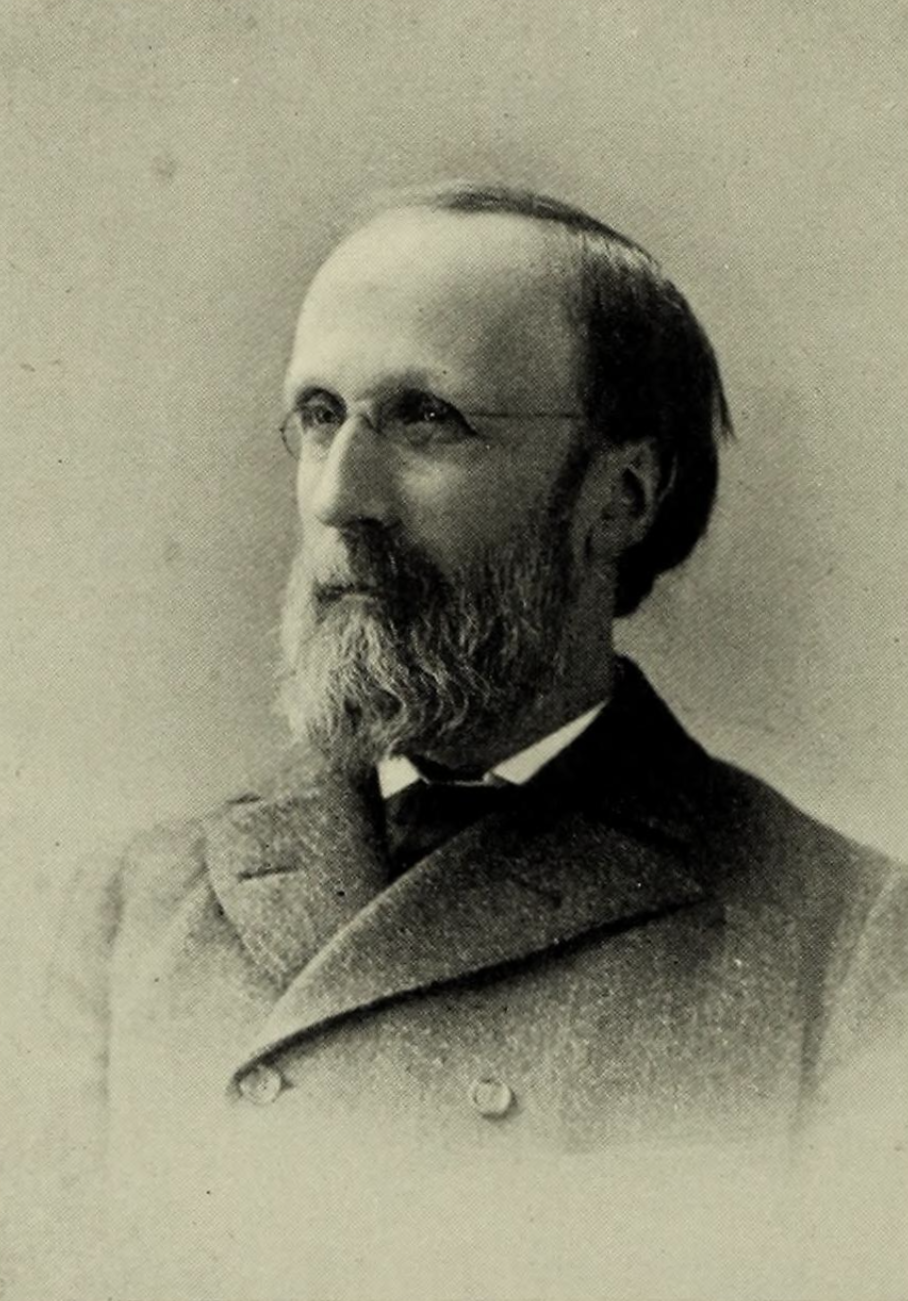
- Born: April 1, 1848; Hudson, Ohio
- Died: December 31, 1907 (aged 59); New Haven, Connecticut
- Education: Western Reserve College
- Occupation: Classics scholar
- Employer(s): Western Reserve College; Yale University
- Spouse: Sarah Melissa Hitchcock
- Children: Elizabeth Day; Clara Hitchcock; Charles Seymour

Academic work
- Main interests: Homeric poetry

Thomas Day Seymour (April 1, 1848 – December 31, 1907) was an American classical scholar. He spent most of his career as a Professor of Greek at Yale University and published primarily on the works of Homer.

== Life ==
Born in Hudson, Ohio, Seymour graduated with a B.A. in 1870 at Western Reserve College, present day Case Western Reserve University, where his father, Nathan Perkins Seymour, was for many years Professor of Greek and Latin. He received an ad eundem degree from Yale in 1870, and honorary LL.D. degrees from Western Reserve in 1894, from Glasgow University in 1901, and from Harvard University in 1906. He was elected to the American Academy of Arts and Sciences in 1900 and the American Philosophical Society in 1906.

After studying in Berlin and Leipzig and making many visits to Greece, Seymour returned to Western Reserve College as professor of Greek from 1872 to 1880 before becoming professor of Greek at Yale University in 1880, holding his position until his death in New Haven.

From 1887 to 1901 Seymour was chairman of the managing committee of the American School of Classical Studies at Athens, and was president of the Archaeological Institute of America from 1903. He was one of the American editors of the Classical Review.

He was the father of Yale President Charles Seymour, and the great-nephew of Yale President Jeremiah Day.

He married Sarah Melissa Hitchcock (b. Sep. 27, 1846) of Burton, Ohio on July 2, 1874, daughter of Western Reserve College president Rev. Henry L. Hitchcock and granddaughter of Justice Peter Hitchcock. They had three children; Elizabeth Day Seymour (b. Jan 21, 1876) was his eldest daughter, and she married John Angel in 1942. Clara Hitchcock Seymour was born on March 28, 1880, and his youngest child Charles Seymour was born on Jan. 1, 1885.

== Publications ==
Other than his Selected Odes of Pindar (1882), Seymour's published work was largely confined to the study of the Homeric poems, viz:

- "On the Date of the Prometheus of Aeschylus" (1879)
- An Introduction to the Language and Verse of Homer (1885)
- Homer's Iliad, i.-iv. (1887–1890)
- Homeric Vocabulary (1889)
- "Carroll Cutler" (1894)
- Introduction and Vocabulary to School Odyssey (1897)
- The College Series of Greek Authors, editor with Lewis R Packard and John W White.
  - Plato: Apology of Socrates and Crito (1885) Ginn & Co.
- "The First Twenty Years of the School At Athens" (1902)
- Life in the Homeric Age (1907)
