= Ragone plot =

Plot for comparing energy density of energy-storing devices

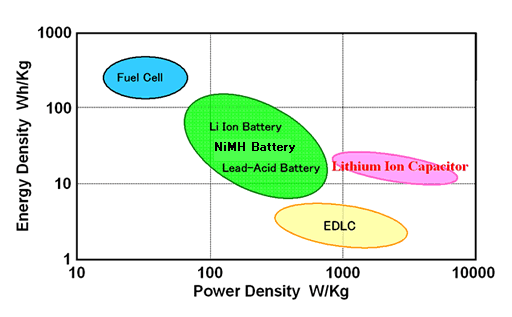
Ragone plot showing specific energy versus specific power for various energy-storing devices

A Ragone plot (/rəˈɡoʊniː/ rə-GOH-nee) is a plot used for comparing the energy density of various energy-storing devices. On such a chart the values of specific energy (in W·h/kg) are plotted versus specific power (in W/kg). Both axes are logarithmic, which allows comparing performance of very different devices. Ragone plots can reveal information about gravimetric energy density, but do not convey details about volumetric energy density.

The Ragone plot was first used to compare performance of batteries. However, it is suitable for comparing any energy-storage devices, as well as energy devices such as engines, gas turbines, and fuel cells. The plot is named after David V. Ragone.

Conceptually, the vertical axis describes how much energy is available per unit mass, while the horizontal axis shows how quickly that energy can be delivered, otherwise known as power per unit mass. A point in a Ragone plot represents a particular energy device or technology.

The amount of time (in hours) that a device can operate at its rated power is given by the ratio of its specific energy (Y-axis) to its specific power (X-axis). This relationship holds regardless of the device's overall size, as a larger device would have proportional increases in both energy and power. Consequently, the iso curves (constant operating time) in a Ragone plot are straight lines.

For electrical systems, the following equations are relevant:

$$\text{specific energy} = \frac{V \times I \times t}m,$$

$$\text{specific power} = \frac{V \times I}m,$$

where V is voltage (V), I electric current (A), t time (s) and m mass (kg).

== See also ==
- von Kármán–Gabrielli diagram
