= Gilbert S. Carpenter =

US Army brigadier general

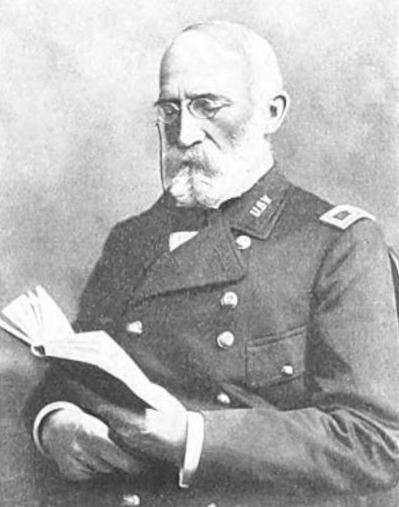
- Born: 17 April 1836; Medina, Ohio, US
- Died: 12 August 1904 (aged 68); Montclair, New Jersey, US
- Burial place: Glendale Cemetery, Akron, Ohio, US
- Education: Western Reserve University
- Spouse: Elizabeth Thacher Balch (m. 1863–1904)
- Children: 7
- Relatives: Dudley Saltonstall (great-grandfather)
- Military career
- Allegiance: Union (American Civil War); United States
- Service: Union Army; United States Army
- Service years: 1861–1899
- Rank: Brigadier General
- Unit: U.S. Army Infantry Branch
- Commands: Fort Sedgwick; Company K, 14th Infantry Regiment; Ad Hoc Battalion, 14th Infantry Regiment; Company D, 14th Infantry Regiment; Company G, 14th Infantry Regiment; Fort Klamath; 18th Infantry Regiment
- Wars: American Civil War; Spanish–American War; Philippine–American War

Gilbert S. Carpenter (17 April 1836 – 12 August 1904) was a career officer in the United States Army. A veteran of the American Civil War, American Indian Wars, Spanish–American War, and Philippine–American War, he served from 1861 until 1899. He was promoted to temporary brigadier general during the Spanish–American War and permanent brigadier general while serving in the Philippines. Carpenter retired a few months before reaching the mandatory retirement age of 64.

A native of Medina, Ohio, Carpenter was raised and educated in Akron and graduated from Akron High School in 1854. He graduated from Western Reserve University in 1859, read law with his father, and was admitted to the bar in 1861. Instead of practicing law, he enlisted in the Union Army for the American Civil War. In April 1861, Carpenter joined the 19th Ohio Infantry Regiment, a three-month unit raised at the start of the conflict. He was commissioned as a second lieutenant and served until the unit was mustered out in August.

In September 1861, he joined the 18th Ohio Infantry Regiment as a private, and he was subsequently promoted to first sergeant of the regiment's Company F. In June 1862, he was again commissioned as a second lieutenant, and in November he was promoted first lieutenant. Carpenter received brevet promotion to captain in December 1862 to recognize his commendable service in Tennessee during the Battle of Stones River.

Carpenter remained in the army after the war, and in January 1867 he was promoted to captain in the 45th Infantry Regiment. In 1869, he transferred to the 14th Infantry Regiment, with which he served until 1894, when he was promoted to major in the 4th Infantry Regiment. In 1897, he was promoted to lieutenant colonel and second-in-command of the 7th Infantry Regiment.

In September 1898, Carpenter was promoted to temporary brigadier general of United States Volunteers when the army expanded for the Spanish–American War, and he served in Cuba during the war. In May 1899, he was discharged from the volunteers, and in June 1899, he was promoted to colonel in the regular army. From June to December 1899, he commanded the 18th Infantry Regiment in the Philippines during the Philippine–American War. On 5 December 1899, Carpenter was promoted to brigadier general in the regular army. He then requested retirement, which was approved on 26 December. In retirement, Carpenter resided in Montclair, New Jersey and Akron, Ohio. He died in Montclair on 12 August 1904 and was buried at Glendale Cemetery in Akron.

== Early life ==
Gilbert Saltonstall Carpenter was born in Medina, Ohio on 17 April 1836, a son of attorney and judge James Sumner Carpenter and Frances C. (Saltonstall) Carpenter. He was raised and educated in Akron, Ohio and graduated from Akron High School in 1854. Carpenter was a student at Western Reserve University, from which he graduated in 1859. (Note: According to an explanatory note on page 15 of the 1916 Western Reserve College Catalogue, students were grouped by class year, and within each year, graduates and non-graduates were separated, with graduates listed first. Carpenter is listed second alphabetically in the section for 1859 graduates.) After college, he studied law with his father, and he attained admission to the bar in 1861. Rather than beginning to practice law, Carpenter decided upon a military career. On 22 April 1861, he joined the Union Army for the American Civil War when he enlisted in the 19th Ohio Infantry Regiment. He was commissioned as a second lieutenant of this 90-day regiment, and he served until the unit was mustered out on 31 August 1861.

On 14 September 1861, Carpenter reenlisted, this time as a private in the 18th Ohio Infantry Regiment. He was subsequently promoted to first sergeant in the regiment's Company F, and he served until 8 June 1862. On 9 June, he was commissioned again as a second lieutenant, and on 25 November 1862 he was promoted to first lieutenant. Carpenter served until the end of the war, and received brevet promotion to captain on 31 December 1862 in recognition of his gallant and meritorious service during the Battle of Stones River in Tennessee. He was wounded at Stones River, after which he performed commissary and staff duties at the War Department, which included a confidential mission to Dry Tortugas in 1865 and an assignment as courier of Abraham Lincoln's confidential papers from Washington to Springfield, Illinois.

=== Family ===
On 18 March 1863, Carpenter married Elizabeth Thacher Balch (1837–1914) of Akron. They were the parents of seven children, four of whom lived to adulthood.

Carpenter's ancestors included prominent members of the Saltonstall and Dudley families. Among them was great-grandfather Dudley Saltonstall, a prominent Continental Navy officer during the American Revolutionary War.

== Later career ==
Carpenter remained in the army after the end of the war in 1865 and was promoted to captain on 21 December 1866. On 22 January 1867, he was commissioned as a captain in the regular army and assigned to the 45th Infantry Regiment. On 22 July 1869, Carpenter was transferred to the 14th Infantry Regiment. He remained with the 14th Infantry for the next 24 years, mostly on duty in the Pacific Northwest during the American Indian Wars. In 1871, he was assigned to command Fort Sedgwick, Colorado. By May 1873, he was commanding Company K, 14th Infantry at Fort Laramie, Wyoming.

During the Seattle riot of 1886, Carpenter led an ad hoc battalion of four 14th Infantry companies from Vancouver Barracks to Seattle, where they remained until the unrest had subsided. In 1889, he was in command at Fort Klamath, Oregon then was assigned to Fort Hamilton, New York. In August 1890, he was transferred from command of the 14th Infantry's Company K to command of its Company D. In October 1891 he was transferred from command of Company D to command of Company G. He was later assigned to recruiting duty in Cleveland. In May 1893, he was posted to the Puyallup Indian Reservation in Washington state. He was promoted to major in the 4th Infantry Regiment on 1 March 1894. On 7 July 1897, Carpenter was promoted to lieutenant colonel and second-in-command of the 7th Infantry Regiment. He served in Cuba during the Spanish–American War, including participation in the July 1898 Battle of El Caney.

On 21 September 1898, Carpenter received temporary promotion to brigadier general of United States Volunteers. On 12 May 1899, he returned to his permanent rank of lieutenant colonel, and he was promoted to colonel on 20 June 1899. He served in the Philippines during the Philippine–American War as commander of the 18th Infantry Regiment, which he led from June to December. After returning to the United States, on 5 December 1899 Carpenter was promoted to brigadier general in the regular army. He would have reached the mandatory retirement age of 64 in April 1900, but requested retirement soon after his promotion. His application was approved, and he left the army on 31 December 1899.

In retirement, Carpenter resided in Akron, Ohio and Montclair, New Jersey. He died in Montclair on 12 August 1904. Carpenter was buried at Glendale Cemetery in Akron.

== Dates of rank ==
Carpenter's dates of rank were:

- Second Lieutenant (Union Army), 22 April 1861
- Private to First Sergeant (Union Army), 14 September 1861 to 8 June 1862
- Second Lieutenant (Union Army), 9 June 1862
- First Lieutenant (Union Army), 25 November 1862
- Captain (Brevet) (Union Army), 31 December 1862
- Captain (Union Army), 21 December 1866
- Captain (Regular Army), 22 January 1867
- Major (Regular Army), 1 March 1894
- Lieutenant Colonel (Regular Army), 7 July 1897
- Brigadier General (United States Volunteers), 21 September 1898
- Lieutenant Colonel (Regular Army), 12 May 1899
- Colonel (Regular Army), 20 June 1899
- Brigadier General (Regular Army), 5 December 1899
- Brigadier General (Retired), 26 December 1899
