= Hiram Collins Haydn =

American minister

Hiram C. Haydn
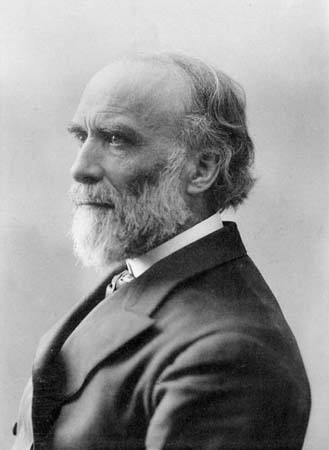

5th President of Western Reserve University
- In office 1887–1890
- Preceded by: Carroll Cutler
- Succeeded by: Charles F. Thwing

Personal details
- Born: December 11, 1831 Pompey, New York, U.S.
- Died: July 31, 1913 (aged 81) Cleveland, Ohio, U.S.
- Resting place: Lake View Cemetery, Cleveland
- Education: Amherst College; Union Theological Seminary

Rev. Hiram Collins Haydn (December 11, 1831 – July, 31, 1913) was an American minister and the fifth President of Western Reserve University, now Case Western Reserve University.

== Biography ==
Haydn was born in Pompey, New York, December 11, 1831.

He graduated from Amherst College in 1856 and Union Theological Seminary in 1859. He was pastor of the First Presbyterian Church (Old Stone Church) on Public Square in Cleveland from 1872–1880 and 1884–1902.

While president at Western Reserve from 1897–1890, he most notably ended coeducation, instead creating a coordinate system solution, establishing the College for Women, later named Flora Stone Mather College.

Wrote "The History of Presbyterianism in Cleveland," published in 1893 by Winn and Judson, and wrote much of "Annals of the First Presbyterian Church of Cleveland, 1820-1895," in 1895, also published by Winn and Judson.

Haydn died in Cleveland on July 31, 1913, and was buried at Lake View Cemetery.
