= David H. Auston =

Canadian-American physicist (born 1940)

David Henry Auston

5th President of the Case Western Reserve University
- In office July 1, 1999 – April 27, 2001
- Preceded by: Agnar Pytte
- Succeeded by: James W. Wagner (interim); Edward M. Hundert

Personal details
- Born: November 14, 1940 (age 85) Toronto, Ontario, Canada
- Scientific career
- Education: University of California, Berkeley; University of Toronto
- Known for: Auston switch
- Awards: Member of National Academy of Sciences, National Academy of Engineering, American Academy of Arts and Sciences
- Fields: Materials science, Optics
- Workplaces: Kavli Foundation; Case Western Reserve University; Rice University; Columbia University; Bell Labs
- Thesis: Transverse mode locking (1969)
- Doctoral advisor: John Whinnery
- Doctoral students: Anthony M. Johnson

David Henry Auston (born 1940) is a Canadian-born American physicist, known for his work on terahertz technology, and in particular, the development of the Auston switch.

Auston was born in Toronto, Ontario, Canada, in 1940, and completed his B.A.Sc. and M.A. degrees in Engineering Physics and Electrical Engineering respectively, from the University of Toronto. He then moved to California to work at the General Motors Defense Laboratory, and completed his PhD in Electrical Engineering from the University of California, Berkeley in 1969, working in the then-new area of laser physics. He was then offered a job at the AT&T Bell Labs with an open research mandate. Once there, he collaborated with materials scientist Alastair M. Glass to study properties of electro-optic crystals. Shortly after, he came up with the idea of using photoconducting antennae as both a source and detector of radiation, developing what came to be known as Auston switches.

After the downsizing of Bell Labs in 1987, Auston moved to Columbia University as Professor of Electrical Engineering and Applied Physics, then to Rice University as Provost in 1994, until being appointed President at Case Western Reserve University in 1999. In 2003, he moved back to Santa Barbara, California, to serve as the President of the Kavli Foundation.

Auston was elected a member of the National Academy of Engineering in 1989 for pioneering development in the field of picosecond and femtosecond optoelectronics.
