= Auston switch =

Antenna capable of producing and detecting tremendously high-frequency radiation

An Auston switch (also known as a photoconductive switch) is an optically gated antenna that is commonly used in the generation and detection of pulsed terahertz radiation. It is named after the physicist David H. Auston who first developed the technology at Bell Labs in the 1960s.

== Working ==
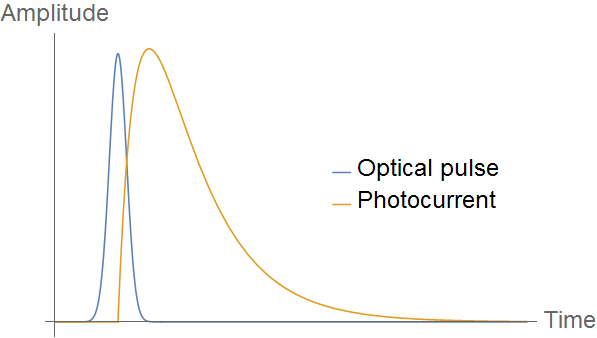
Typical time response of a photocurrent generated with an Auston switch using a femtosecond laser pulse.

An Auston switch consists of a transmission line antenna with a gap that is bridged by a semiconductor. For terahertz generation, a DC bias voltage is applied across the antenna. When light from a pulsed laser with femtosecond pulses is focused on the gap, it excites charge carriers into the semiconductor's conduction band, which are subsequently accelerated by the bias voltage. The induced acceleration from the photocurrent causes the charge carriers to radiate in terahertz frequencies, generating a pulse lasting several picoseconds.

For use as a terahertz detector, the switch consists of the same geometry but without the applied bias voltage. Instead, the incident terahertz pulse itself provides the bias field for the charge carriers during the interval when the switch is activated by the (much shorter) laser pulse. The induced photocurrent can then be amplified and measured. To map the entire span of the terahertz pulse, the time delay between the femtosecond pulses at generation and detection can be varied.
