= Carroll Cutler =

Forth president of the Western Reserve College

- Cutler in 1880

4th President of Western Reserve College
- In office 1871–1886
- Preceded by: Henry L. Hitchcock
- Succeeded by: Hiram C. Haydn

Personal details
- Born: January 31, 1829 Windham, New Hampshire, U.S.
- Died: January 25, 1894 (aged 64) Talladega, Alabama, U.S.
- Resting place: Markillie Cemetery; Hudson, Ohio, U.S.
- Spouse: Frances E. Gallagher
- Education: Yale University; Yale Divinity School

Rev. Carroll Cutler (January 31, 1829 – January 25, 1894) was the fourth president of Western Reserve College, now Case Western Reserve University.

Cutler was born January 31, 1829, in Windham, New Hampshire. He attended high school at Phillips Academy in Andover, Massachusetts, from 1847 to 1850. Cutler graduated from Yale College in 1854. While at Yale, Cutler became a member of the elite secret society of Skull and Bones in 1854. He graduated from Yale Divinity School in 1858. On August 10, 1858, he married Frances Elizabeth Gallagher. That same year, he with his wife left for Germany to study philosophy for a year, interacting with such philosophers as August Tholuck, Hermann Hupfeld, and Hermann Ulrici.

Cutler came to Western Reserve College in 1860 as a professor of philosophy and rhetoric, teaching for 29 years until 1889. After the resignation of President Henry L. Hitchcock, Cutler served as president of Western Reserve College from 1871–1886.

In 1882, Cutler moved Western Reserve College from Hudson, Ohio, to its current location in the University Circle neighborhood on the east side of Cleveland, under the new name, Adelbert College of Western Reserve University. Mandated in the gift by Amasa Stone, new trustees were appointed after the move, including John Hay, Rutherford B. Hayes, and James A. Garfield.

Cutler resigned from the presidency in 1886 under pressure and disagreement of ending coeducation. Revisiting his abolitionist beliefs, he spent his remaining years teaching at small all-black colleges in Charlotte, North Carolina, and Talladega, Alabama. He died in Talladega from pneumonia on January 25, 1894, and his body was returned to Hudson, Ohio, for burial.
