= Agnar Pytte =

4th President of Case Western Reserve University
- In office July 1, 1987 – June 30, 1999
- Preceded by: David V. Ragone
- Succeeded by: David H. Auston

Personal details
- Born: December 23, 1932 Kongsberg, Norway
- Died: November 6, 2015 (aged 82) Hanover, N.H. U.S.
- Spouse: Anah Currie Loeb
- Education: Princeton; Harvard
- Scientific career
- Fields: Physics
- Workplaces: Dartmouth College
- Thesis: Internal Bremsstrahlung in [b] decay (1958)

Agnar "Ag" Pytte (December 23, 1932 – November 6, 2015) was the fourth President of Case Western Reserve University.

Pytte was born in Kongsberg, Norway, on December 23, 1932, to Ole and Edith (Christiansen) Pytte.

During his senior year of high school, Pytte moved to the United States in 1949 to attend Phillips Exeter Academy in New Hampshire. He received his bachelor's degree in physics from Princeton University in 1953. He married Anah Currie Loeb on June 18, 1955. After receiving his Ph.D. in 1958 from Harvard University, he accepted a faculty position at Dartmouth College in Physics and Astronomy. Pytte later served as chairman of that department, Associate Dean of Faculty, Dean of Graduate Studies, and provost during the presidency of David T. McLaughlin. In 1987, he left Dartmouth to become the fourth president of Case Western Reserve University in Cleveland, Ohio.

During Pytte's twelve years as president, the university completed $325 million in capital projects, including the Mandel School of Applied Social Sciences (now the Jack, Joseph, and Morton Mandel School of Applied Social Sciences), Richard F. Celeste Biomedical Research Building, Kent Hale Smith Engineering and Science Building, George S. Dively Executive Education Center, and Veale Athletic Center.

Pytte served on the board of directors for Goodyear Tire and Rubber Company from 1988 to 2004. He was a member of the American Physical Society, Sigma Xi, and Phi Beta Kappa.

He died November 6, 2015, in Hanover, New Hampshire, of complications from Parkinson's disease.
