= T. Keith Glennan =

NASA administrator

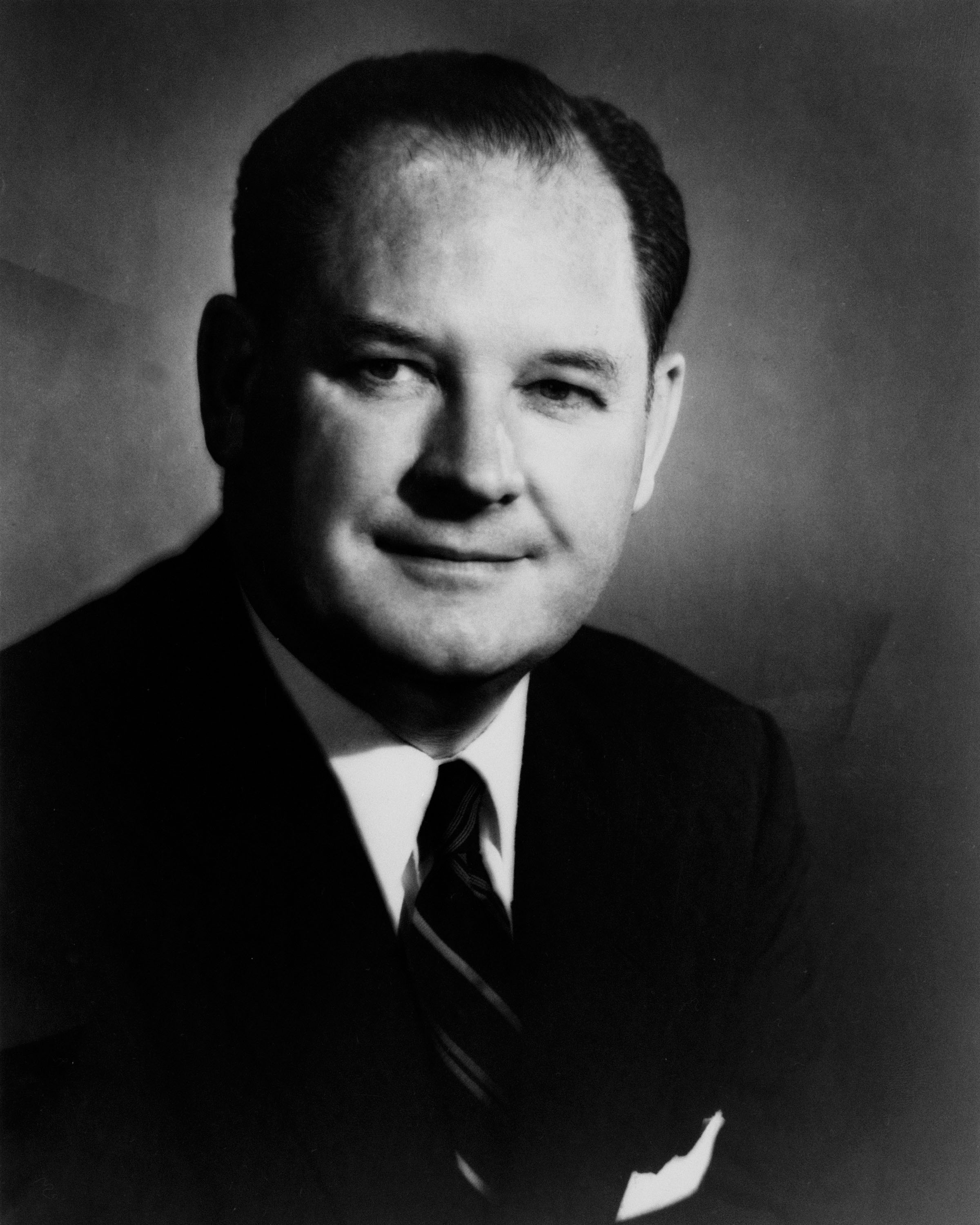
- Glennan in 1972

1st Administrator of the National Aeronautics and Space Administration
- In office August 19, 1958 – January 20, 1961
- President: Dwight D. Eisenhower
- Deputy: Hugh L. Dryden
- Preceded by: Inaugural holder
- Succeeded by: James E. Webb

4th President of Case Institute of Technology
- In office 1947–1966
- Preceded by: William E. Wickenden
- Succeeded by: Robert W. Morse

Personal details
- Born: Thomas Keith Glennan; September 8, 1905 Enderlin, North Dakota
- Died: April 11, 1995 (aged 89) Mitchellville, Maryland
- Party: Republican
- Education: University of Wisconsin-Eau Claire; Yale University
- Occupation: Administrator; Scientist; University dean

Thomas Keith Glennan (September 8, 1905 – April 11, 1995) was the first administrator of the National Aeronautics and Space Administration, serving from August 19, 1958, to January 20, 1961.

== Early career ==
Born in Enderlin, North Dakota, the son of Richard and Margaret Glennan, he attended the University of Wisconsin–Eau Claire and then earned a degree in electrical engineering from the Sheffield Scientific School of Yale University in 1927, where he was a member of Chi Phi fraternity. Following graduation, he became associated with the newly developed sound motion picture industry, and later became assistant general service superintendent for Electrical Research Products Company, a subsidiary of Western Electric Company. During his career he was studio manager of Paramount Pictures, and Samuel Goldwyn Studios, and was briefly on the staff of Vega Aircraft Corporation.

Glennan joined the Columbia University Division of War Research in 1942, serving throughout World War II, first as Administrator and then as Director of the U.S. Navy's Underwater Sound Laboratories at New London, Connecticut. At the end of the war, Glennan became an executive of the Ansco Corp. in Binghamton, New York. From this position he was called to the presidency of the Case Institute of Technology in Cleveland, Ohio. During his administration, Case rose from a primarily local institution to rank with the top engineering schools in the United States. From October 1950 to November 1952, concurrent with his Case presidency, he served as a member of the U.S. Atomic Energy Commission.

== Administration ==
As NASA Administrator, Glennan presided over an organization that had absorbed the earlier National Advisory Committee for Aeronautics (NACA) intact; its 8,000 employees, an annual budget of $100 million, and three major research laboratories—Langley Aeronautical Laboratory, Ames Aeronautical Laboratory, and Lewis Flight Propulsion Laboratory—and two small test facilities made up the core of the new NASA.

Within a short time after NASA's formal organization, Glennan incorporated several organizations involved in space exploration projects from other federal agencies into NASA to ensure that a viable scientific program of space exploration could be reasonably conducted over the long-term. He brought in part of the Naval Research Laboratory in NASA and created for its use the Goddard Space Flight Center.

He also incorporated several disparate satellite programs, two lunar probes, and the research effort to develop a million pound force (4.4 MN) thrust, single-chamber rocket engine from the U.S. Air Force and the U.S. Department of Defense's (DOD) Advanced Research Projects Agency. In December 1958 Glennan also acquired control of the Jet Propulsion Laboratory, a contractor facility operated by the California Institute of Technology. In 1960, Glennan obtained the transfer to NASA of the Army Ballistic Missile Agency, located at Huntsville, Alabama, and renamed it the Marshall Space Flight Center.

By mid-1960, Glennan had secured for NASA primacy in the federal government for the execution of all space activities except reconnaissance satellites, ballistic missiles, and a few other space-related projects, most of which were still in the study stage, that the Defense Department controlled.

== Later career ==
Upon leaving NASA in January 1961, Glennan returned to the Case Institute of Technology, where he continued to serve as president until 1966. During this period he helped to negotiate the merger of Case with Western Reserve University, creating Case Western Reserve University. After his retirement in 1966, Glennan spent two years as president of Associated Universities, Inc., a Washington-based advocate for institutions of higher education.

A resident of Reston, Virginia for twenty years after his retirement, he moved to Mitchellville, Maryland in the late 1980s. He died at Collington Life Care Community in Mitchellville in April 1995, after a stroke. He was survived by his wife, Ruth (née Adams) Glennan.

Government offices
New office	1st NASA Administrator; 1958 - 1961	Succeeded by James E. Webb
