= Charles Backus Storrs =

American minister, abolitionist, and educator (1794–1833)

1st President of Western Reserve College and Preparatory School
- In office 1830–1833
- Preceded by: New position
- Succeeded by: George E. Pierce

Personal details
- Born: May 23, 1794 Longmeadow, Massachusetts
- Died: September 15, 1833 (aged 39) Braintree, Massachusetts
- Resting place: Elm Street Cemetery, Braintree
- Education: College of New Jersey (Princeton); Andover Theological Seminary

Rev. Charles Backus Storrs (May 23, 1794 – September 15, 1833) was an American minister, abolitionist, and the first President of Western Reserve College and Preparatory School, now Case Western Reserve University and Western Reserve Academy.

Storrs was born in Longmeadow, Massachusetts on May 23, 1794. First studying at the College of New Jersey, present day Princeton University, from 1810 to 1813, Storrs had to drop out due to poor health. Eventually following his father and both grandfathers who were clergyman, Storrs graduated from Andover Theological Seminary in 1820. Two years later, in 1822, he moved into the Western Reserve region of northeastern Ohio, where he became pastor of a church in Ravenna, Ohio. In 1828, he became a professor at the newly formed Western Reserve College and Preparatory School, in Hudson, Ohio. Two years later, in 1830, he was appointed as its first president. During his tenure, influenced by David Garrison's writings, he became known as a vocal abolitionist, collaborating with Western Reserve professors Elizur Wright and Beriah Green. Storrs held the office until 1833, when he had to resign due to failing health. He died on September 15, 1833, at his brother's house in Braintree, Massachusetts.

John Greenleaf Whittier wrote a poem about him, "To the Memory of Charles B. Storrs".
