= Hasselmo =

Hasselmo is a surname. Notable people with the surname include:

- Ann Die Hasselmo (fl. 1986), American college president
- Michael Hasselmo (born 1962), American neuroscientist
- Nils Hasselmo (1931–2019), American university president
