= Eastcliff (mansion) =

- Edward and Markell Brooks House
- U.S. National Register of Historic Places
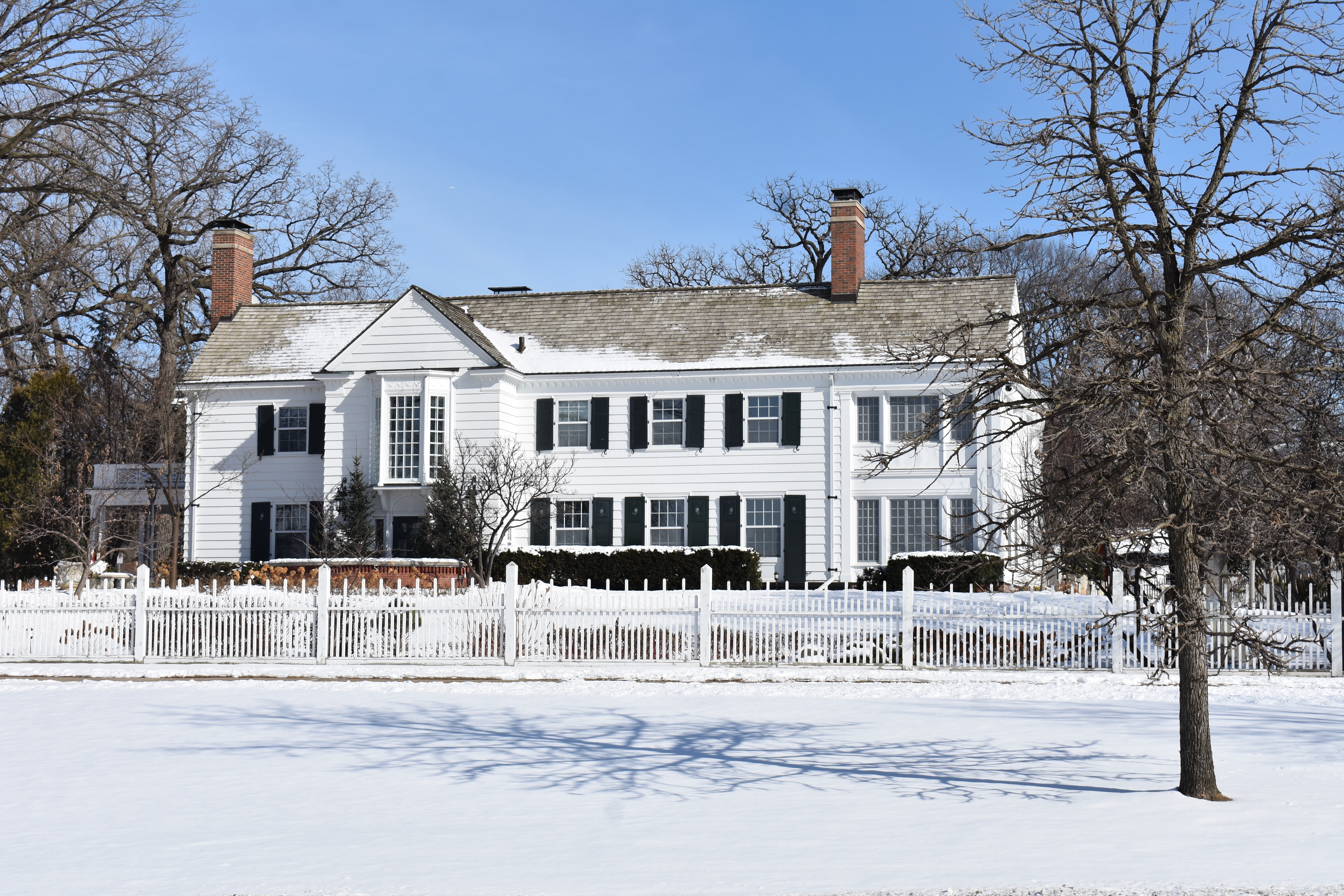
- Eastcliff residence in 2025

- Location within Minnesota Location within the United States
- Location: 176 N. Mississippi River Blvd. St. Paul, Minnesota
- Coordinates: 44°56′47″N 93°11′54″W
- Built: 1921
- Architect: Clarence H. Johnston Sr.; Clarence H. Johnston Jr.
- Architectural style: Colonial Revival
- NRHP reference No.: 00000689
- Added to NRHP: June 15, 2000

Eastcliff is a 20-room house overlooking the Mississippi River in St. Paul, Minnesota, United States, which serves as the official residence of the president of the University of Minnesota system. It was first built in 1922 by local lumber magnate Edward Brooks Sr. and donated to the university by the Brooks family in 1958, beginning its service as the president's official residence in 1960 when O. Meredith Wilson took the position. In 2000, the home was added to the National Register of Historic Places.

Today, it is the most-visited public residence in the state (outpacing the Minnesota Governor's Residence), often hosting events five days a week. Eastcliff hosts 150+ events and 8,000 guests each year.

In July 2024, the University of Minnesota Board of Regents voted to recommend that the University continue to preserve and enhance the historic Eastcliff residence with private philanthropy funding through the University of Minnesota Foundation. The University of Minnesota Foundation seeks to raise $10.5M for immediate operations and capital improvements as well as establish an endowment that will be used to cover annual operating expenses in the future.

== Presidents ==
The following is a list of university presidents who have resided at Eastcliff:

- O. Meredith Wilson
- Malcolm Moos
- C. Peter Magrath
- Kenneth Keller
- Nils Hasselmo
- Mark Yudof
- Robert H. Bruininks
- Eric W. Kaler
- Joan T.A. Gabel
- Rebecca Cunningham

Before Eastcliff became the president's residence, Pillsbury House, built in 1877, was the official residence.

== Property ==
The building was designed in the Georgian colonial style by Clarence H. Johnston Sr., a close friend of Brooks and an architect who had designed many buildings at the university to fit a master plan by Cass Gilbert. Numerous renovations took place over the years, though repair efforts did not keep pace with wear and tear. In 1988, extensive repairs began on the house, but unforeseen problems caused costs to double. The ensuing outcry contributed to the exit of president Kenneth Keller from office.

The main house is 10,000 square feet, with the entire property encompassing 20,000 square feet including the carriage house and summer house. The property value is estimated at $3.1 million, according to Ramsey County property tax records. The property is 1.6 acres.

In 2010, $550,000 in renovations were planned after the departure of President Bruininks. The renovations were approved by the Minnesota State Historic Preservation Office and the Brooks family, who owned the property.

In 2018, $1 million in renovations were planned after the departure of President Eric Kaler.

== Governor's Residence ==
On July 10, 2023, Governor Tim Walz's family moved into Eastcliff while the Minnesota Governor's Residence undergoes renovations. The mansion was unoccupied at the time after President Gabel's resignation. The Walz family is expected to stay at Eastcliff for 18 months. The state of Minnesota is paying $4,400 in monthly rent, and is also responsible for "direct costs such as utilities, snow removal and lawn care."

== See also ==
- List of university and college presidents' houses in the United States
- National Register of Historic Places listings in Ramsey County, Minnesota
