= Mark Yudof =

Law professor and academic administrator, born 1944

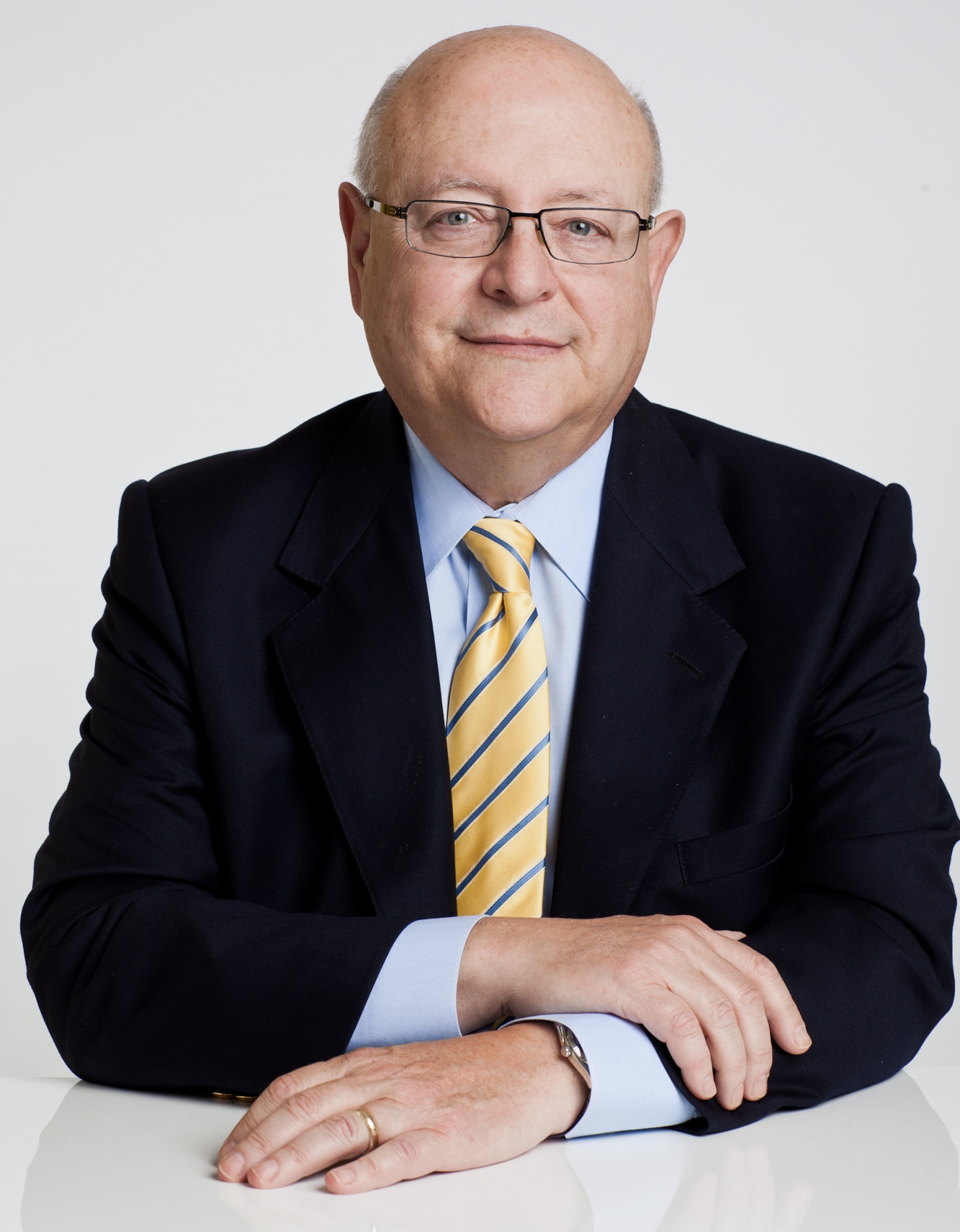
- Yudof in 2012

19th President of the University of California
- In office June 16, 2008 – September 6, 2013
- Preceded by: Robert C. Dynes
- Succeeded by: Janet Napolitano

9th Chancellor of the University of Texas System
- In office August 1, 2002 – June 15, 2008
- Preceded by: R. D. Burck
- Succeeded by: Francisco G. Cigarroa

14th President of the University of Minnesota
- In office July 1, 1997 – July 31, 2002
- Preceded by: Nils Hasselmo
- Succeeded by: Robert Bruininks (interim)

Personal details
- Born: Mark George Yudof; October 30, 1944 (age 81) Philadelphia, Pennsylvania, U.S.
- Spouse: Judy Gomel
- Education: University of Pennsylvania (BA, LLB)
- Profession: University administrator, law professor

Mark George Yudof (born October 30, 1944) is an American law professor. He served as the 19th president of the University of California from 2008 to 2013, as the 9th chancellor of the University of Texas system from 2002 to 2008, and as the 14th president of the University of Minnesota from 1997 to 2002.

Yudof was a faculty member at the University of Texas at Austin for 26 years, serving as dean of the University of Texas School of Law from 1984 to 1994 and as the university's executive vice president and provost from 1994 to 1997.

== Early life ==
Born in Philadelphia to parents of Ukrainian Jewish descent, Yudof was raised in West Philadelphia. Yudof's father worked as an electrician. Yudof earned his B.A. cum laude in political science from the University of Pennsylvania in 1965 and LL.B. cum laude from the University of Pennsylvania School of Law in 1968.

== Legal and academic career (1971–1984) ==
Yudof joined the faculty of The University of Texas School of Law in 1971. He has also been a visiting professor at the University of Michigan Law School and UC Berkeley School of Law.

Yudof is a recognized expert in the fields of constitutional law, freedom of expression, and education law. He was co-counsel for the plaintiffs in the 1973 U.S. Supreme Court case San Antonio v. Rodriguez, the landmark school finance lawsuit. He is the author of Gender Justice (with David L. Kirp and Marlene Franks), (Chicago Press, 1986; Paperback, 1987) and of When Government Speaks: Politics, Law, and Government Expression in America, (The University of California Press, 1983). Yudof became a member of the State Bar of Texas in 1980.

== University administration career ==
=== Dean of the University of Texas School of Law (1984–1994) ===
From 1984 to 1994, Yudof served as dean of the University of Texas School of Law.

=== Executive vice president and provost of the University of Texas at Austin (1994–1997) ===
From 1994 to 1997, Yudof served as executive vice president and provost of the University of Texas at Austin. In that position, Yudof initiated many improvements to undergraduate education, including creating a freshman seminar program and Academy of Distinguished Teachers.

=== President of the University of Minnesota (1997–2002) ===
On July 1, 1997, Yudof took office as the 14th president of the University of Minnesota. In his first year as president, Yudof took advantage of a state budget surplus to fund construction projects, historic preservation, and academic priorities at the university. Yudof helped to establish freshman seminars. In 1999 the university moved from a quarter to semester system.

The university encountered scandal in 1999 after the St. Paul Pioneer Press reported that an academic counseling staffer at Minnesota claimed to have done coursework for many student-athletes on the Minnesota Golden Gophers men's basketball program over the past five years, as well as several other NCAA rules violations by Minnesota basketball. Yudof oversaw self-imposed sanctions on the men's basketball program. Those sanctions included a $1.5 million buyout of the contract of head coach Clem Haskins, a postseason ban for the 1999–2000 season, and scholarship reductions. The scandal led to the resignations of men's athletic director Mark Dienhart and university vice president McKinley Boston. Members of the university board of regents praised Yudof for his handling of the scandal. By 2002, Yudof united men's and women's athletics at Minnesota under a single athletic director.

In 2002, a six-story apartment-style hall was built at the University of Minnesota and was named Riverbend Commons and then subsequently renamed after Mark G. Yudof. It is currently referred to as Yudof or Yudof Hall.

=== Chancellor of the University of Texas System (2002–2008) ===
Yudof became the ninth chancellor of the University of Texas System on August 1, 2002. Simultaneously, he was president emeritus at the University of Minnesota and Charles Alan Wright Chair in Federal Courts at the University of Texas School of Law. As University of Texas System chancellor, Yudof allowed individual campuses to set their own tuition rates. He resigned on June 15, 2008, to become President of the University of California system.

=== President of the University of California (2008–2013) ===
In March 2008, Yudof was selected as the next president of UC, to succeed Robert C. Dynes. He began his term on June 16, 2008.

In November 2009, TIME Magazine recognized Mark Yudof as one of the "10 Best College Presidents", citing his efforts to provide opportunity and access to a quality education for California residents with financial need whose family income is less than $60,000.

In January 2013, Yudof announced his plan to resign as president of the University of California, effective August 31, 2013. He was heavily criticized for securing the maximum pension of $350,000 after only 7 years of service, including one year on paid sabbatical and another in which he taught only one class per semester.

==== California budget crisis ====
The California budget crisis resulted in massive cuts to higher education by the California State Legislature and Governor Arnold Schwarzenegger. Struggling to grapple with the ensuing crisis, California legislative leaders cut more than 20 percent from the UC budget in one year - the largest budgetary reduction in the history of the UC. In a July 9 "Open Letter to UC alumni and friends," UC Regent Richard Blum; Russell Gould, then-chair; Sherry Lansing, then-vice chair; and UC president Yudof wrote,

"The UC model — providing universal access to a top-notch, low-cost education and research of the highest caliber — continues to be studied around the globe among those who would emulate its success. And yet, this model has been increasingly abandoned at home by a state government responsible for its core funding."

As state budgetary support declined dramatically, Yudof kicked off an online grassroots advocacy effort in order to make the case for the University of California. In 2008, Yudof organized advocacy efforts on social media. Yudof called on all students, faculty, staff, alumni and friends to unite behind an aggressive push to make funding UC a state priority.

In 2009, Yudof further bolstered this effort through a campaign seeking to let legislators and the governor know how critical their support is in preserving the university's commitment to quality and student access.

Also in 2009, Yudof came under criticism for an interview that he gave to Deborah Solomon of the New York Times, in which he joked about taking a pay cut from his salary of over $800,000 to $400,000 in exchange for the White House and Air Force One.

== Selected papers ==
Citing increasingly unreliable funding provided to universities by state government, President Yudof called for the federal government to bolster its financial commitments to the nation's universities and colleges in his paper titled Exploring a New Role for Federal Government in Higher Education. In announcing the proposal, Yudof remarked:

We must find creative ways to expand the federal commitment to research and access into a new category: The nuts-and-bolts core funding that is vital to a robust university, allowing it to hire quality professors, equip laboratories and expand the physical plant.

New York Times columnist Bob Herbert visited the UC Berkeley campus and had this to say:

The problems at Berkeley are particularly acute because of the state's drastic reduction of support. But colleges and universities across the country — public and private — are struggling because of the prolonged economic crisis and the pressure on state budgets. It will say a great deal about what kind of nation we've become if we let these most valuable assets slip into a period of decline.

His op-ed piece, "Cracks in the Future," ran in the New York Times citing UC Berkeley as evidence of the cracks appearing in America's cornerstone of civilization - higher education.

== Recognition ==
Yudof is a fellow of the American Academy of Arts and Sciences and a member of the American Law Institute. In 1993, he and his wife, Judy, were the co-recipients of the Jewish National Fund Tree of Life Award. Judy Yudof served as the first female international president of the United Synagogue of Conservative Judaism in 2002. In February 2010, Regents of the University of Texas System established the Mark G. and Judy G. Yudof Chair for the benefit of the University of Texas School of Law. In 2012, The Jewish Daily Forward named Yudof in its "Forward 50" list of influential Jewish Americans.

== See also ==
- List of presidents of the University of Minnesota

Academic offices
| Preceded by Nils Hasselmo | 14th President of the University of Minnesota; 1997 – 2002 | Succeeded by Robert Bruininks |
