= Linster =

Linster is a surname that may refer to:

- Charles Linster, first person to set a Guinness World Record for push ups
- Christiane Linster (born 1962), Luxembourg-born behavioral neuroscientist and professor
- Léa Linster (born 1955), Luxembourgish chef
- Wes Linster, fossil hunter who discovered the Bambiraptor skeleton
