= Scandinavian migration to the Hawaiian Kingdom =

Scandinavian migration to the Hawaiian Kingdom occurred in the late 19th century when poor economic conditions in Northern Europe led to successive waves of Nordic immigration to North America. Hundreds of thousands of people left their home countries for better opportunities in the United States. At the same time, in 1875, the governments of the United States and the Kingdom of Hawai'i negotiated and ratified a reciprocity treaty, leading to major investment in the sugar plantations in Hawaii, which required an increase in the labor supply to grow. Planters continued bringing in large numbers of foreign laborers from Asian countries, but now also began to bring in smaller numbers of workers from Europe.

In 1880, acting on behalf of the Kingdom and the planters, Christian L'Orange recruited workers in Drammen, Norway. Newspaper ads promised three-year contracts on sugar plantations for those willing to make the journey. More than 600 signed up for the trip to Hawaii, including single men and entire families with children. The group traveled on board two main ships, with a third ship carrying a smaller number of the group along with mostly German passengers. The ships—the Beta, the Musca, and the Cedar—encountered a rough and dangerous voyage lasting four to six months. Some passengers and crew died during the voyage, mostly children, due to malnourishment along the way. Upon arrival in Hawaii, which was then known as the Sandwich Islands in Europe, the authorities determined that some of the migrants were suffering from starvation.

After an initially difficult voyage, things did not seem to improve for many of them after landfall on Maui and the island of Hawai'i, although some fared better on O'ahu and elsewhere. Some of the migrants believed they were treated unfairly and that their original contract had been changed. Multiple investigations into their alleged mistreatment were made by local authorities, but it was not until the San Francisco Chronicle published their stories of slave-like conditions to the wider world, that an international investigation occurred. The Scandinavian immigrants participated in three of the most significant labor strikes on sugar plantations in Hawaii before annexation, with most, but not all, leaving the islands for California or returning to Europe.

== Background ==
In the 19th century, the Hawaiian islands began to be seen as an ideal location for the sugar cane industry. Its soil fertility, precipitation, and climate were all conducive to cultivating sugar and sugar plantations in Hawaii could produce enormous yields (at the expense of a longer growing season) that dwarfed their competitors elsewhere in the world. The unique nature of the harvesting process required a large and ready labor pool to cut the cane and haul it from the fields to the mill when the cane was still ripe, otherwise the crop would sour, (Note: Carol A. MacLennan: "Cane sugar production was probably the first true industry of the modern era, due to the biochemical properties of the sugarcane plant (a grass), which requires rapid transportation of cut cane to the mill. The sucrose content of sugarcane deteriorates rapidly once cut. Thus, sugar production created factories in the fields in the Americas as early as the sixteenth century, dictated by the need for centralization and hierarchy, uniting the field and mill most efficiently.") costing the plantations money. By the 1830s, sugar plantations in Hawaii began to rapidly grow as an industry, with at least 22 mills refining sugar in the Hawaiian Kingdom by 1838.

From the beginning, the sugar industry faced a labor scarcity problem, with Native Hawaiians, a then-shrinking (Note: Carol A. MacLennan: "Estimated human population at the time of Cook's arrival varies—ranging from 279,000 by demographer Eleanor Nordyke, to 800,000 by historian David Stannard. By 1850, Hawaiian numbers had fallen to 70,000; and by 1900 to just under 30,000.") labor source since first contact, going on general strike for better pay in 1841 (Note: See the table Hawai'i Sugar Plantation Labor Strikes, Before 1898.) at the Ladd & Company sugar plantation in Kōloa, Kauaʻi, the first commercial sugar plantation in Hawaii. The strike was broken after two weeks. By 1850 the labor problem had become intractable and changes were needed. In June, the Hawaii legislature passed An Act for the Government of Masters and Servants (1850), legalizing apprenticeships, indentured service, and allowing for foreign workers to be brought in from outside the Kingdom. The law also allowed for child labor, with children as young as 10 working on the plantations.

The new law made it difficult for workers to strike, and was said to resemble a kind of slavery. Kamehameha III promoted the first treaty of friendship, commerce, and navigation between the Hawaiian Kingdom and the Kingdoms of Sweden and Norway in 1852. It was ratified under Kamehameha IV in 1855. The American Civil War (1861–1865) disrupted the sugarcane industry in Louisiana, which was produced with slave labor and supplied 50% of all U.S. sugar at the time. Sugar prices rose 525% in a few years. With demand for sugar in Hawaii growing, in 1864, the Bureau of Immigration was created to regulate and recruit immigrants to address the labor shortage. The signing of the Reciprocity Treaty of 1875 gave Hawaiian unrefined sugar tariff-free status in the mainland American marketplace and strengthened the standing of the then small Hawaiian sugar industry for stable investment and future growth.

Following the passage of these laws, sugar plantations in Hawaii began importing labor from Asian countries, including workers from China (1852), Japan (1868), Korea (1903), and the Philippines (1904). The difficulty of retaining labor of any ethnicity, the perceived threat of Asian labor to white supremacy, and entrenched racism by elites, led to failed attempts to "Europeanize" the agricultural workforce. European immigrants came to work on the sugar plantations in lesser numbers, with workers from Portugal, Spain, Germany, Russia, and Italy. (Note: See the table Contract Labor Immigrants to Hawai'i, 1852–1905.) The dire problem of labor shortages in Hawaii appeared to have been solved. In just eight years, from 1882 to 1890, sugar plantations increased their labor supply from 8,000 to 18,000 workers, with sugar production more than doubling during that same time from 57,000 to 130,000 tons. (Note: The timeline of the Scandinavian migration to the Kingdom of Hawai'i was quickly followed by radical changes in the region. By the end of the migration in 1882, the Planters' Labor and Supply Company was formed. The sugarcane industry began to organize and exert their enormous power along with those who wished to see Hawaii join the United States, by force if necessary. In 1887, businessmen, sugar planters, and politicians stripped Kalākaua of his powers with the Bayonet Constitution. Queen Lili'uokalani proposed restoring the monarchy with a new constitution in 1893, but the Hawaiian Kingdom was overthrown several days later, ultimately leading to the annexation of the Hawaiian Islands to the United States in 1898.)

== Recruitment ==
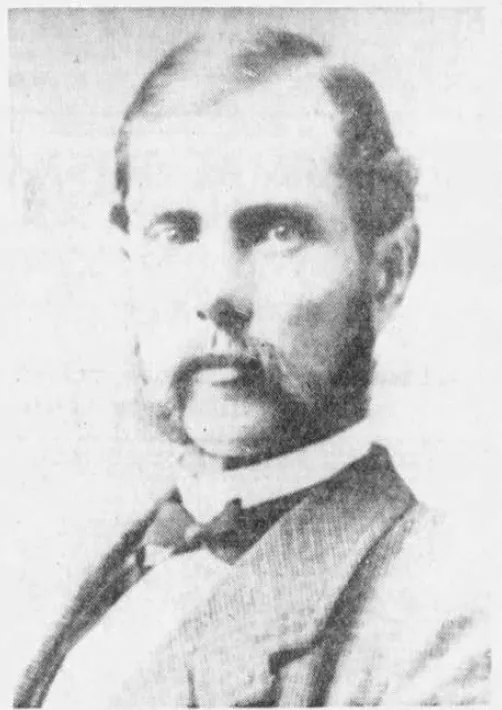
Henrick Christian L'Orange

Scandinavians played an important role in the Hawaii sugar industry before their mass migration in 1880s. Throughout the 19th and early 20th century upwards of 800,000 people left Norway, many of them coming to the United States due to economic hardships. (Note: Knut Vollebæk, former Norwegian ambassador to the United States (2001–2007): "More than 800,000 Norwegians left Norway during much of the 19th century and first part of the 20th century. Most of them sailed west, to America, searching to find a better future for themselves and their families.") By 1853, there were only eight Norwegians living in Hawaii. In 1856, Nordic immigrant and Hawaii sugarcane plantation pioneer Valdemar Emil Knudsen (1820–1898) arrived in Kauaʻi, where he ran the Grove Farm plantation for Hermann A. Widemann along with his partner, ship captain Henrik Christian L'Orange (1843–1916), who was originally from Halden, Norway.

With the sugar plantation labor shortage looming large, in 1878, L'Orange proposed bringing more workers to the islands from Northern Europe. King Kalākaua authorized the project and commissioned L'Orange as the recruiter. The Bureau of Immigration made his role official in 1880, with Castle & Cooke extending him a letter of credit for $20,000. L'Orange, as it turns out, had a somewhat checkered past. According to anthropologist Knut M. Rio, "L'Orange at this point already had experience with the 'purchase and sale' of workers and had even been banished from the British African colonies for mistreating workers during transportation. He was also to a certain extent disreputable in the Pacific."

To recruit sugarcane workers, L'Orange took out newspaper advertisements (Note: L'Orange's original ad: "To the Emigrants for the Sandwich Islands" "Contracts with those who will go to the Sandwich Islands are drawn up and signed on Wednesday, Sept. 23, and the following days at the office of Hans P. Faye at Drammen from 11 to 3 o'clock. The parties must be provided with good recommendations, and attestations for good and faultless behaviour. Parties under obligation of military service must bring release from service. Signature of minors must, to be valid, be confirmed by guardian. "The conditions are now regulated, and thus fixed: laborers over 20 years, 9 dollars; under 20 years, somewhat less, per month, with free board, or board-money and free lodgings, families may bring two children with them. Free passage and board, which is not to be worked out afterwards. "Chr. L'Orange, Agent for the Hawaiian Bureau of Immigration, Sandwich Islands") in Drammen on September 15. The ads were followed by an article in the Drammens Tidende which promoted the recruitment drive to potential applicants, making fanciful promises of free pasture for a cow and a horse, and the potential to cultivate land upon arrival in Hawaii. At the time of recruitment, Norway was undergoing a depression and the people were facing unemployment. Labor historian Edward D. Beechert (1920–2014) notes that the recruits "were almost all unemployed craftsmen and artisans and townspeople", who signed up due to poverty and were taken in by stories about Hawaii. With all of these factors at play, the ads were successful, and initially attracted about 630 people who signed up as willing contract laborers. The terms were for a three-year contract, involving either fieldwork (10 hours per day) or mill work (12 hours a day), with four days off per month. The contract included wages of $9 per month ($293.24 in 2024), board and lodging, and healthcare. Violations of the contract could lead to fines and even imprisonment.

== Voyage ==
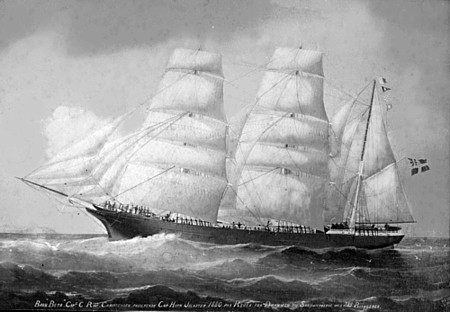
The barque Beta (1880)

In late 1880, two barques left Drammen carrying more than 600 Norwegians, Swedes, and Danes. A third barque, the Cedar, left Bremen, Germany, in early 1881, carrying mostly Germans, but also ten Norwegians and four Swedes. The Cedar was part of a larger effort to bring German workers to the sugar plantations on the island of Kauaʻi, and was joined by the Ioloni (1882) and the Ehrenfels (1883), which transported an additional 1000 Germans to Kauaʻi over the next several years. Approximately 648 contract laborers eventually arrived in the Kingdom of Hawai'i between February and July 1881, composed of 613 Norwegians, 31 Swedes, and four Danes.

=== Beta ===
The Norwegian barque Beta left Drammen on October 27, 1880, under the command of Captain C. Rist-Christensen. The Beta carried 396 passengers, composed of 327 adults and 69 children. After leaving Drammen, the Beta sailed for 15,000 nautical miles through the North Sea, encountering poor conditions, including rough water and storms. Another ship carrying passengers had overturned with no survivors along their route. They later discovered that it had been falsely reported as their own, and their friends and relatives thought they had all died. They next headed out to the Atlantic Ocean. They were going to sail around South America and Cape Horn using the Drake Passage, but they sailed through the Strait of Magellan instead. Using the strait allowed them to reduce the overall length of their journey by a month.

After successfully navigating through the strait on Christmas Eve, the Captain celebrated by distributing hot toddies to all adults on board. Amidst these good tidings, things took a turn for the worse on New Year's Eve when a fire broke out before it was eventually suppressed. The ship then headed up the coast of Chile and stopped in Valparaíso for provisions before traversing the Pacific Ocean towards the Hawaiian Islands, then known as the Sandwich Islands. Access to fresh food and water was a problem. The limited diet consisted of hard bread, salt dried fish, barley, peas, flour, and rarely, meat. The journey took them four months.

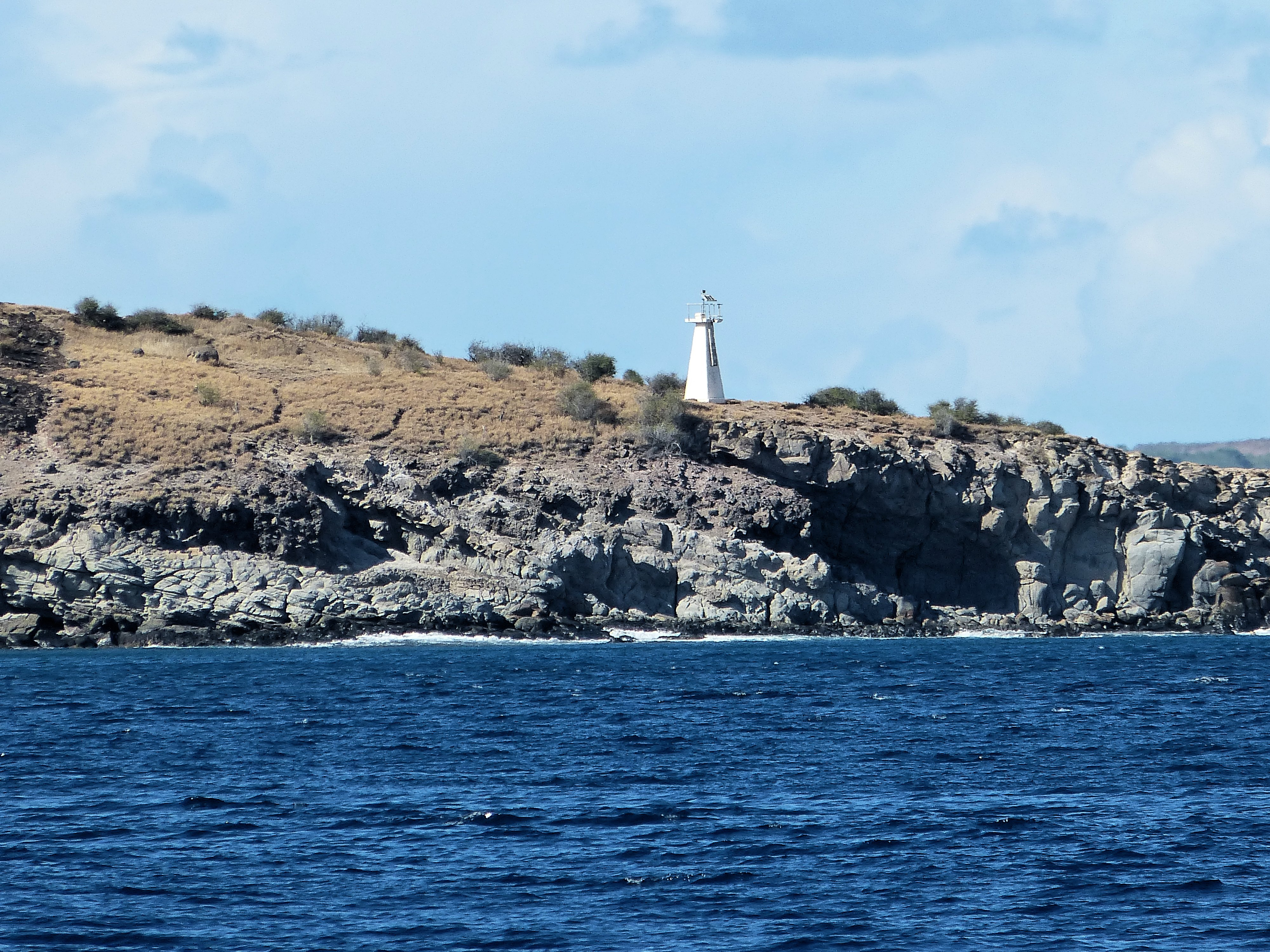
McGregor Point

The Beta arrived first in the Hawaiian Islands on February 18, 1881. After traveling for four months, they set anchor at McGregor Point and disembarked at Mā'alaea Landing. Because the passengers arrived on the dry, leeward side of the island, which sits in the rain shadow of Haleakalā, it is thought that the barren and desolate sight might have contributed to the anxiety of the migrants. Whale boat tenders transferred them to the shore, where according to one Swedish eyewitness, they were given numbers and a lottery was held, dividing up the workers who would be split up and taken to plantations on different islands. The lottery divided up some families, where "brother was separated from brother, father from son and brother from sister". Married couples were kept together. The migrants believed they were treated harshly by the plantation managers, later comparing it to that of a slave market in a complaint that made its way to the Consul General for Sweden and Norway.

=== Musca ===
The German barque Musca left Drammen on November 23, 1880, under the command of Captain D. W. Oltman with 237 people aboard, of which 57 were children. Eyewitness accounts from people aboard the Musca described it as a confined living space where people were segregated for the long trip by marital status. 25 people died during the journey, including seven adult passengers, seven crew members, and 11 children who lacked access to proper food. One family lost three children, ages 9, 7, and 6. Their three year old survived and the grieving mother gave birth to another child during the trip. Passengers on the Musca complained about the food they were given and were told by the crew: "It was good enough for slaves— shut up; otherwise we will put you in irons and lock you up." The Musca arrived several months after the Beta in Honolulu on May 13, (Note: Kuykendall corrects the arrival date from May 14 to May 13, finding that the May 14 date was likely erroneously duplicated as the ship arrived on May 13 according to local newspapers.) 1881. The voyage of the Musca took six months, and upon arrival, the authorities discovered that many of the passengers were suffering from starvation.

=== Cedar ===
German businessman Paul Isenberg came to Hawaii in 1858 and moved to the island of Kauaʻi, where he worked in Wailua. He began managing the Līhu'e sugarcane plantation in 1862. In 1874, Lunalilo (1835–1874) appointed Isenberg to the upper House of Nobles in the legislature of the Hawaiian Kingdom and he became a citizen. Four years later, he retired and moved back to Germany, but still had business interests in the islands, with his brother Carl managing the plantation. In 1881, Paul Isenberg became partners with Hackfeld & Company, and arranged for German workers to work on his sugarcane plantations in Kauaʻi. The French-built, German-owned barque Cedar was the first of three to bring Germans to migrate to Kauaʻi to work on his sugarcane plantations. Among the 128 people on board the Cedar, were ten Norwegians and four Swedes. The ship arrived in Honolulu on July 18, 1881. Norwegian carpenter Martin Olaus Jensen Blackstad (1854–1932), who was 27 years old at the time, provided a firsthand account of the entire trip for his family. The Blackstad's went on to run a dairy farm and a butcher shop in Waimea, Kauaʻi County.

== Plantations ==
228 of the 400 arrivals from the Beta, including men, women, and their accompanying children, were chosen to work on sugarcane plantations on Maui. They were put into ox carts and taken to different plantations on the eastern, windward side, most of which were assigned by Castle and Cooke. These include the Alexander & Baldwin sugarcane plantations, some of which were located in or near Paia, Hāmākuapoko, and Haiku, but also plantations outside the Castle and Cooke network, such as the Bailey Plantation in Wailuku. Plantation housing was not yet available for everyone as the Beta had arrived a month early. Those without housing moved into warehouses for a short period. 99 people were assigned to the Big Island and taken from Maui to Hawaii by boat to work the Pāpa'ikou Plantation.

=== Alexander & Baldwin ===
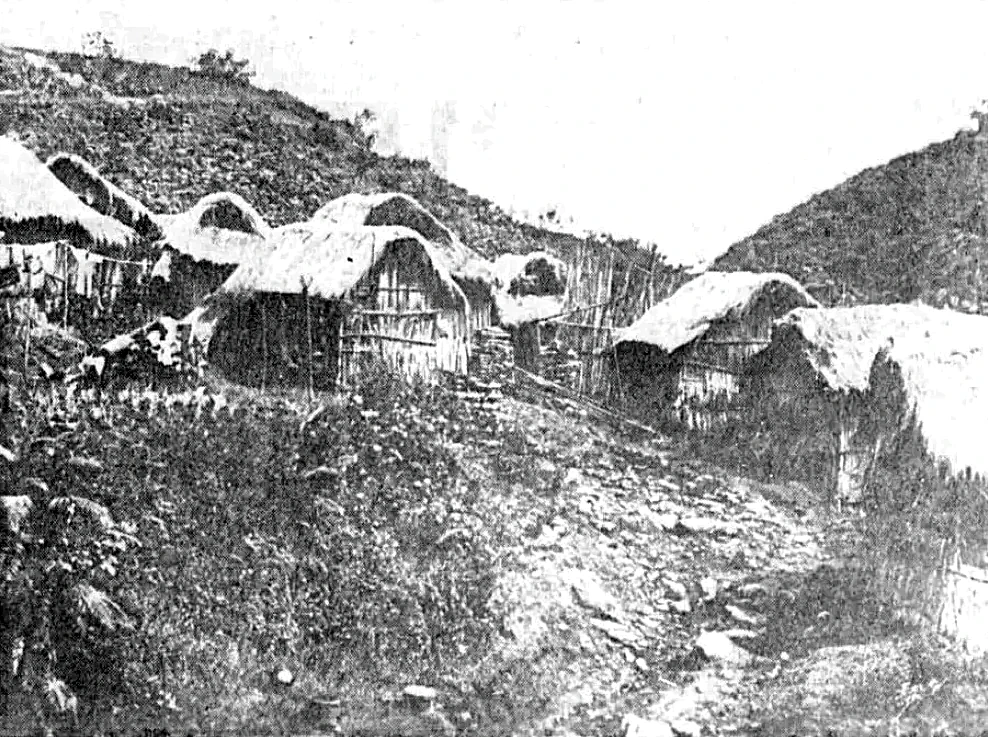
Grass shacks for sugarcane plantation workers, 1881

Sugar plantation business partners Alexander & Baldwin originally became active in 1869 in Hāmākuapoko on the east side of the island of Maui. In 1881, at least 42 Nordic immigrants were sent to their sugarcane plantation as workers. In October of that year, they went on strike for various reasons, including what they perceived as access to low-quality comestibles. They were tried in court for breaking their contract, with 18 strikers imprisoned and fined. The others resumed work under the threat of long prison sentences.

=== Kohala ===
Nordic people fared better than many others on the Kohala plantation. The Kohala plantation was established by Elias Bond (1813–1896), a missionary and teacher in the socially liberal tradition of the United Church of Christ. Unlike other plantations, Kohala was known for its lack of authoritarianism and absence of slave-like labor conditions. However the immigrants also went on strike due to concerns about food, and won their case in court, after which they resumed work.

=== Pāpa'ikou ===
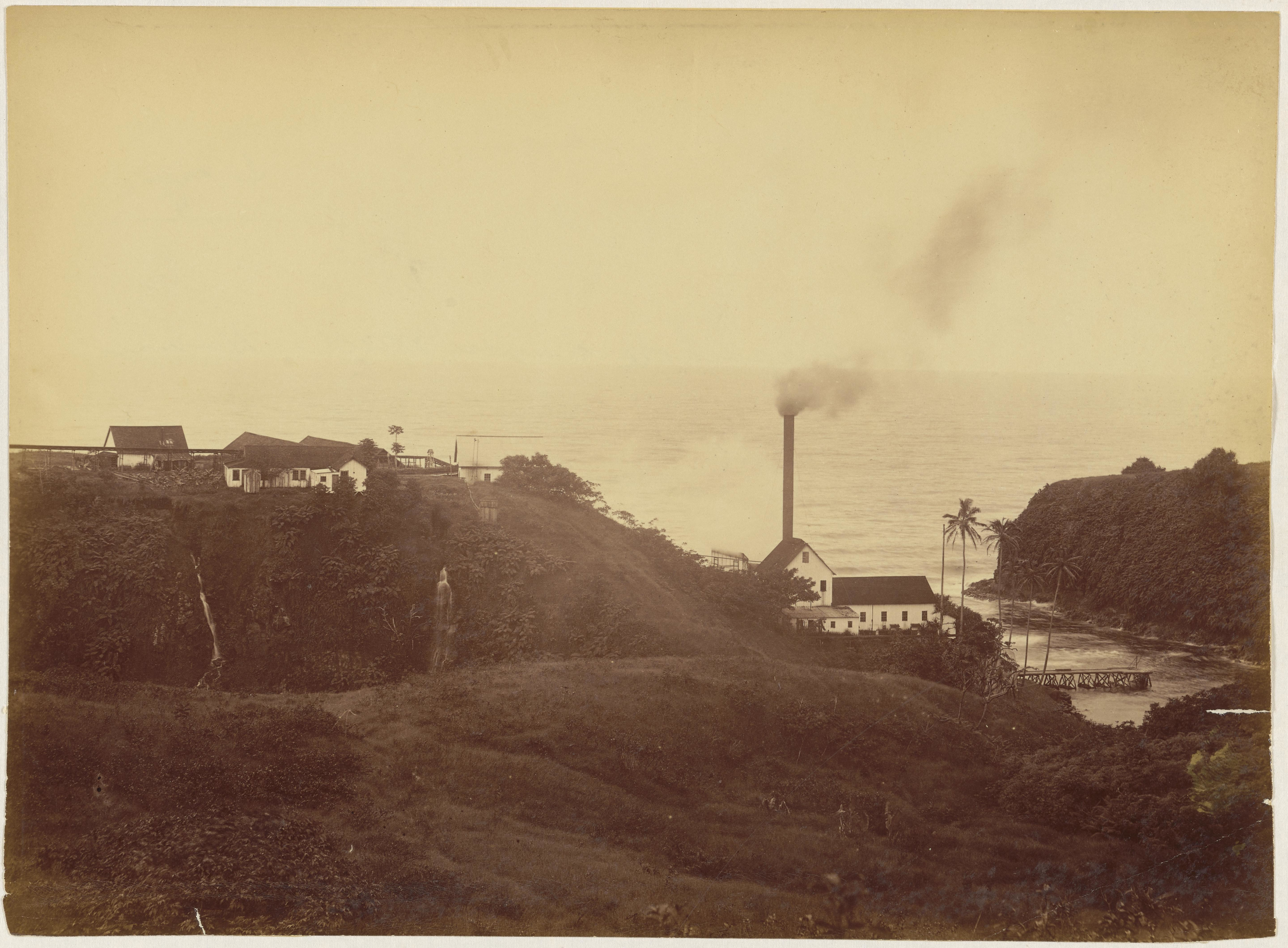
Pāpa'ikou plantation

The largest single group of immigrants, a group of more than 60, were sent to the sugarcane plantation at Pāpa'ikou on the island of Hawaii run by Edward Griffin Hitchcock (1837–1898). Hitchcock was inflexible and unyielding to the concerns of the new arrivals and was unwilling to make accommodations. The new immigrants lodged various complaints; one dispute concerned the original labor contract they had signed in Norwegian, which stipulated that wives were to be provided with food. Somehow, this was no longer present in the English-language version of the original contract.

Other conflicts involved their housing and quality of the food they received. They also found the plantation foremen heavy-handed, with a habit of beating the immigrants and subtracting wages for violations of the rules. Further, as mostly artisans and not agricultural workers, they soon became aware that the three-year contracts they were locked into as indentured laborers paid far less than those of skilled workers in town, skills many of them already possessed. They quickly organized and held one of the first labor strikes in the islands in October 1881. The case went to court, and the workers were ordered to return to work. They refused, and 57 were sentenced to prison, but the order was unenforceable as the prison was already full. After some time, the workers returned to working on the plantation, but they felt they had no legal way to seek help under the Hawaiian justice system of the time.

== Investigations ==
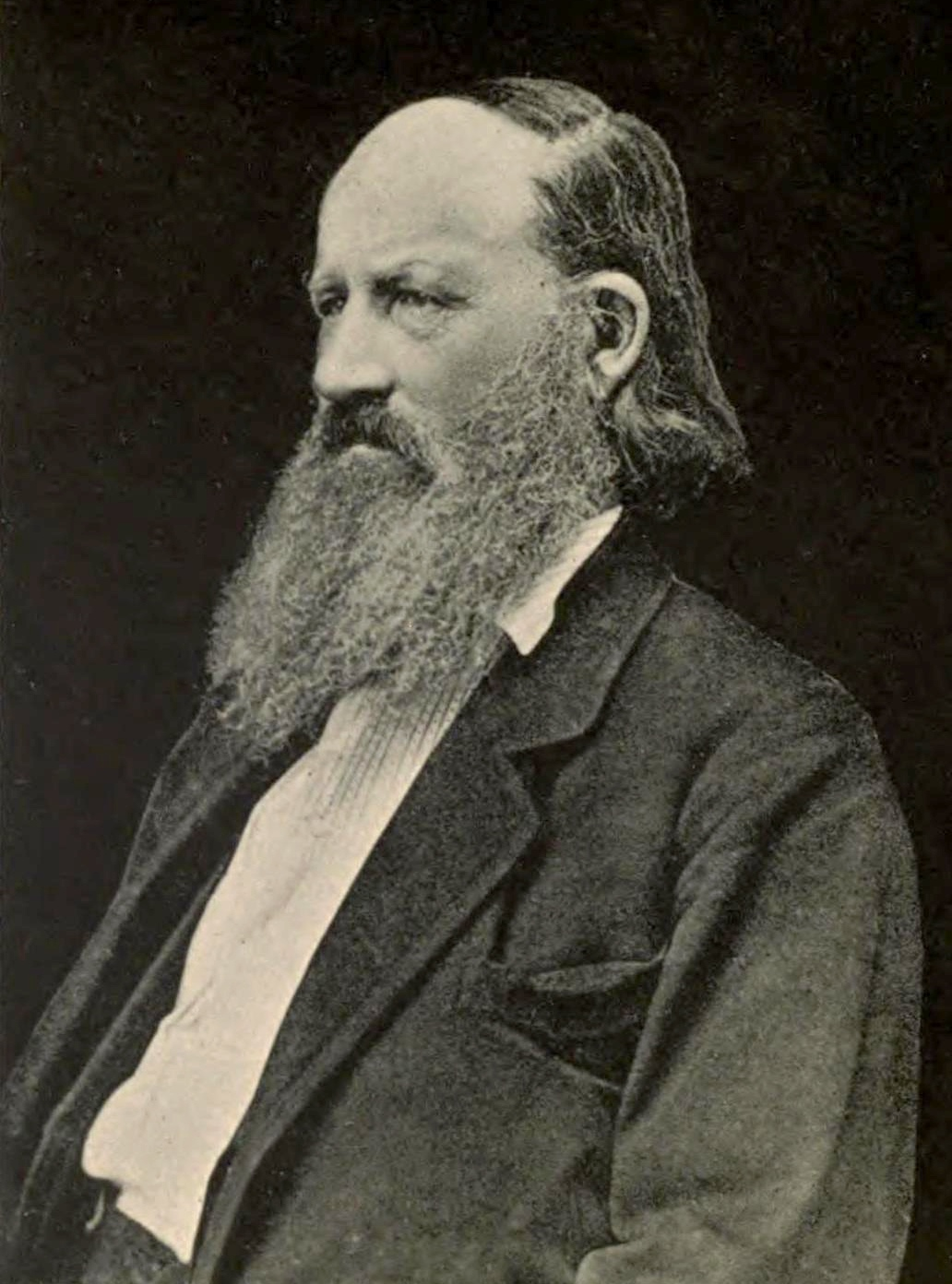
Abraham Fornander, c. 1878

Swedish-born Abraham Fornander (1812–1887) was brought in twice to investigate and evaluate the Scandinavian labor disputes and strikes, first in early 1881, just two months after their arrival, and a second time in regards to the Hitchcock plantation dispute in Pāpa'ikou in October 1881. The sole consul for Sweden, Norway, and Germany also participated in the inquiry. Fornander, who had been twice appointed as a circuit judge, first by Kamehameha V in 1864, and then later again in 1871, found nothing out of the ordinary and considered the complaints by the Scandinavian workers groundless.

In spite of these setbacks, the workers persisted. In addition to striking and making use of the legal process in the courts, letter writing was one of the main tactics used by the workers to share their complaints and generate support. They wrote letters to friends and family in their home countries about their difficult voyage to Hawaii and the labor dispute they encountered upon arrival. They also wrote to newspapers in the United States who took an interest in their story. The San Francisco Chronicle, which opposed the reciprocity treaty, gave the labor conflict increasing coverage beginning in June 1881, leading to international attention. For the next year, the Chronicle argued in a series of stories that the Scandinavians were subject to white slavery in Hawaii.

Their story received additional attention after the Skandinaven, a Norwegian language paper with a large readership in Chicago, printed a letter from the Pāpa'ikou plantation on February 1, 1882. The story, which became known as "The Hawaiian Hades", was also reprinted and distributed by the Chronicle to a larger audience several months later. These stories gained increasing attention, with newspapers in Europe running articles about purported Scandinavian slave labor in the Sandwich Islands. By March, public meetings were being held in Christiania with the general public calling for the Norwegian government to address the allegations.

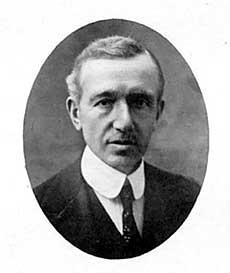
Anton Grip, photographed before 1900

To best address the charges of mistreatment, Oscar II of the Kingdom of Norway and the Kingdom of Sweden authorized Norwegian jurist and diplomat Johan Anton Wolff Grip (1844–1922) from the Ministry of Foreign Affairs in Stockholm to investigate the dispute in March 1882. Grip arrived in Hawaii in October, spending a total of 18 weeks in the islands, visiting the plantations on the Big Island, Maui, and Kauai, where he interviewed 256 people. Of these, he discovered only 26 with experience in agricultural labor.

Grip's report, which was written on December 18, 1882, concluded that most of the concerns were exaggerated, noting that complaints about the food allowance was at the top of the list, which Grip dismissed as a cultural difference. The report also notes "a great many bad people—bummers from the breweries of Christiana and Drammen", people Grip believed were troublemakers. The concerns about the labor contracts and their differences in Norwegian and English were found to be legitimate, with the government of Hawaii and the Swedish Consul taking action to fix the problem. Grip published his final report, "The Conditions of Swedish and Norwegian Workers on the Hawaiian Islands", in 1883. (Note: Grip's original report was titled Der Verhältnisse I der I Schwedischen und Norwegischen Arbeiter I auf den I Hawaiischen Inseln (1883). The English translation was published in 1884.)

== Departure ==
Because of the protracted labor conflict in Hawaii, L'Orange fell out of favor and left Hawaii for Florida where he lived out the rest of his life as a tobacco farmer. By December 1882, few Nordic immigrants remained in Hawaii, with the vast majority having left for San Francisco, California, and still others returning to their home countries. Several decades later, after the United States annexed Hawaii, the 1900 United States census showed 154,001 people living in the Territory of Hawaii, of which 410 Scandinavians were foreign born, including 270 Norwegian and Danish, and 140 Swedish people. In the 1950s, historian Kenneth O. Bjork traced several members of the original Hawaii migration who had moved to California. (Note: A small number of Norwegians played a role in early California history, particularly in the California gold rush (1848–1855). By 1860, records indicate that 715 Norwegians lived in the state. Olaf M. Norlie notes that unlike other U.S. states, no significant colony of Norwegians was ever established in California. (Compare with Solvang, California, a Danish colony created in 1911. Danish Americans purchased 9,000 acres (3,600 ha) in the surrounding Rancho San Carlos de Jonata, Santa Barbara County.) Instead, Norwegians are found distributed throughout the state. By 1890, only 1,396 Norwegians were living in San Francisco.) Some Norwegians eventually moved northward up to the Pacific Northwest after their arrival in San Francisco, to Eureka and as far north as Seattle, Washington.

== Legacy ==
The experience of the migrants in the sugar industry and their struggle for improved working conditions was popularized by newspapers of the time and led to increasing public awareness of labor conditions in the Hawaii sugarcane industry. Journalist Yngve Kvistad notes that Norwegians participated in some of the earliest strikes in Hawaii, and from the very beginning "demanded rights and social conditions far beyond what the local population and other immigrants had in working life." The protracted labor dispute led to lingering anti-Hawaii sentiment back home in Norway which persisted well into the 20th century.

In 1962, writer, librarian, and biographer Eleanor H. Davis of the Library of Hawaii traced the labor history of the Scandinavian arrival for the Industrial Relations Center at the University of Hawaii. She published a revised, shortened version of her research for the Hawaiian Historical Society in 1963. Davis argues that the impact of the Norwegian migrants was substantial, as they "probably created the greatest uproar, nationally and internationally, in the shortest length of time, of any group of immigrants of similar size in Hawaii's history." Almost two decades later, the subject entered popular literature for the first time with Blood in the Furrows (1980), a work of historical fiction about the event.

A year later, and a century after the initial 1881 arrival, the Scandinavian Centennial Commission commemorated the events in the state of Hawaii from February 14–20, 1981. Olle Tunberg, Consul General of Sweden in Los Angeles, was in attendance at the events along with Eleanor H. Davis. As part of the commemoration, a bautastein was installed at McGregor Point near Mā'alaea Landing on Maui, near the location where Beta originally dropped her anchor. Five years later, based on Davis' work, immigration historian Frederick Hale called for a reassessment of how Norwegian migration to Hawaii has traditionally been portrayed in historical scholarship.

In the 2000s, Norwegian author Torbjørn Greipsland published Aloha from Forgotten Norwegians in Hawaii (2004), a collection of accounts about the original Scandinavian voyage to Hawaii. The bautastein at McGregor Point was restored in 2006. The same year, anthropologist Knut M. Rio of the University of Bergen, with funding from the Research Council of Norway, produced new research in 2009 about the role of immigrants at the sugar plantation on Kauaʻi. An exhibition featuring Rio's work was shown at the Bergen Museum from 2009 to 2013. According to the Swedish–American Historical Society, even though most of the Scandinavian people left Hawaii in the 1880s, many people in Hawaii "claim descent from those who remained". The 2000 United States census found that more than 9,000 people in Hawaii reported Norwegian ancestry.

== See also ==
- Nordic and Scandinavian Americans
- Norwegian Americans
- Slooper

== Notes ==
Contract Labor Immigrants to Hawai'i, 1852–1905
Place of origin	Number
Japan	140,457
China	45,064
Portugal	14,670
Korea	6,925
Puerto Rico	5,200
South Sea Islanders	2,450
Spain	2,299
Germany	1,279
Norway	615 (Note: Kuykendell believes the commonly cited number of 615 (which represents only the number of Scandinavian contract laborers that came over on the Beta and Musca, not the Cedar) should be listed as 613 instead, because two of the people on the Musca were paying passengers rather than contract laborers for the sugar industry.)
Austria	372
United States (Black Americans)	200
Russia	110
United States (White Americans)	100
Italy	84

Hawai'i Sugar Plantation Labor Strikes, Before 1898
Year	Plantation	Island	Ethnic group	Issue	Outcome
1841	Ladd & Company, Kōloa	Kauaʻi	Native Hawaiian	Wages	No compromise, returned to work
1881	Alexander & Baldwin	Maui	Norwegian	Food quality	Jailed, returned to work
1881	Bond, Kohala	Hawai'i	Norwegian	Food quality	Workers won court case, returned to work
1881	Hitchcock, Pāpa'ikou	Hawai'i	Norwegian	Food quality, labor contract, working conditions	Workers lost court case, returned to work
1891	Kohala	Hawai'i	Chinese	Contract labor dispute	Police attacked, jailed 55 workers
1894	Kahuku	O'ahu	Japanese	Contract labor dispute	Workers arrested, fined

== Bibliography ==
- Barton, H. Arnold; Johnson, Walter (eds.). (January 1982). "Scandinavian Week in Hawaii". Items. p. 68. The Swedish-American Historical Quarterly. St. Paul, MN: Swedish Pioneer Historical Society. XXXIII (1): 68. ISSN 0730-028X.
- Beechert, Edward D. (1985). Working in Hawaii: A Labor History. University of Hawaii Press. ISBN 9780585239217. OCLC 44955328.
- Beechert, Edward D. (1993). "Patterns of Resistance and the Social Relations of Production in Hawaii". In Lal, Brij V.; Munro, Doug; Beechert, Edward D. (ed.). (1993). Plantation Workers: Resistance and Accommodation. University of Hawaii Press. pp. 45–68. ISBN 9780585239545. OCLC 44955029.
- Bowman, Pierre (October 7, 1980). "The forgotten immigrants: The Scandinavians in Hawaii". The Honolulu Advertiser. pp. C-1, 3.
- Bjork, Kenneth O. (1958). West of the Great Divide: Norwegian Migration to the Pacific Coast, 1847–1893. Norwegian-American Historical Association. OCLC 24605588.
- Clairmont, Ingrid; Clairmont, Leonard (1980). Blood in the Furrows. Exposition Press. ISBN 9780682495042. OCLC 7538134.
- Coman, Katharine (1903). "The History of Contract Labor in the Hawaiian Islands". Publications of the American Economic Association. 4 (3): 1–61.
- Davis, Eleanor H.; Davis, Carl D. (August 1962). Norwegian Labor in Hawaii: The Norse Immigrants. Industrial Relations Center, University of Hawaii. OCLC 2568700.
- Davis, Eleanor H. (1963). "The Norse Migration: Norwegian Labor in Hawaii". Seventy-first annual report of the Hawaiian Historical Society for the year 1962. Hawaiian Historical Society. pp. 28–35. OCLC 722784910.
- Davis, Eleanor H. (1979). Abraham Fornander: A Biography. University of Hawaii Press. ISBN 9780824804596. OCLC 4549397.
- Ekstrand, Florence (1984). Notes from a Scandinavian Parlor. Welcome Press. ISBN 9780916871000. OCLC 11503404.
- Flom, George T. (1909). A History of Norwegian Immigration to the United States from the Earliest Beginning down to the Year 1848. The Torch Press. OCLC 1535742.
- Forbes, David W. (ed.). (2003). Hawaiian National Bibliography 1780–1900. Volume 4, 1881–1900. University of Hawaii Press; Hordern House. ISBN 9780824826369. OCLC 469875173.
- Greipsland, Torbjørn (2004). Aloha from Forgotten Norwegians in Hawaii: From Slavery to Life in a Vacation Paradise. Emigrantforlaget. OCLC 63293064.
  - Greipsland, Torbjørn (2004). Aloha Fra Glemte Nordmenn Pa Hawaii: Fra Slaveliv Til Ferieparadis. Emigrantforlaget. ISBN 9788299692809. OCLC 63292991.
- Grip, Johan Anton Wolff (1884)[1882]. "The Condition of the Swedish and Norwegian Laborers on the Hawaiian Islands. Report by Mr. A. Grip to the Minister of Foreign Affairs at Stockholm." Honolulu Almanac and Directory, 1884: 41–55. OCLC 663247370.
- Hale, Frederick (1986). Their Own Saga: Letters from the Norwegian Global Migration. Minnesota Press. pp. 134–146. OCLC 15204186.
- Joesting, Edward (1984). Kauai: The Separate Kingdom. University of Hawaii Press; Kauai Museum Association. ISBN 9780824811624. OCLC 47080725.
- Jones, C. Allan; Osgood, Robert V. (2015). From King Cane to the Last Sugar Mill: Agricultural Technology and the Making of Hawai'i's Premier Crop. University of Hawaii Press. ISBN 9780824840006. OCLC 890127812.
- Kuykendall, Ralph S. (1967). The Hawaiian Kingdom: Volume 3: The Kalakaua Dynasty, 1874–1893. University of Hawaii Press. OCLC 9780824847357. OCLC 1154960804. doi:10.1515/9780824847357.
- Kvistad, Yngve (17 February 2006). "Slaveliv i paradis". Verdens Gang. Retrieved May 21, 2025. (registration required)
- MacLennan, Carol A. (2014). Sovereign Sugar: Industry and Environment in Hawai. University of Hawai'i Press. ISBN 9780824840242. OCLC 875895012.
- Menton, Linda K. (1989). "Hawai'i sugar plantations". History News. 44 (5): 34–38. (subscription required)
- Merry, Sally Engle (2000). Colonizing Hawai'i: The Cultural Power of Law. Princeton University Press. ISBN 9780691009322. OCLC 41266257.
- Nordyke, Eleanor C. (1989)[1977]. The Peopling of Hawai'i. University of Hawaii Press. ISBN 9780824805340. OCLC 3017235.
- Norlie, Olaf M. (1925). History of the Norwegian People in America. Augsburg Pub. House. OCLC 802304094.
- Rio, Knut M. (2015)[2009]. "From Adventure to Industry and Nation Making: The History of a Norwegian Sugar Plantation in Hawai'i". In Kjerland, Kirsten Alsaker; Bertelsen, Bjørn Enge (ed.). Navigating Colonial Orders: Norwegian Entrepreneurship in Africa and Oceania. Bergen Books. pp. 240–266. ISBN 9781782385400. OCLC 896840457. doi:10.1515/9781782385400.
- San Francisco Chronicle. (June 29, 1881). "The Beta, Sandwich Islands". p. 3. Newspapers.com. Retrieved April 18, 2025.
- San Francisco Chronicle. (October 25, 1881). "Dignity of Labor in Hawaii". p. 2. Newspapers.com. Retrieved April 18, 2025.
- San Francisco Chronicle. (October 25, 1881). "Norse Serfs: Norwegian Peasants Entrapped in Hawaii". p. 3. Newspapers.com. Retrieved April 18, 2025.
- San Francisco Chronicle. (February 17, 1882). "Enslaved Northmen: The Startling Story of a Hawaiian Overseer". p. 1. Newspapers.com. Retrieved April 18, 2025.
- San Francisco Chronicle. (February 19, 1882). "Tracking Norwegians: How They Were Persuaded to Become Hawaiian Peons". p. 8. Newspapers.com. Retrieved April 18, 2025.
- San Francisco Chronicle. (April 5, 1882). "Sugar-Field Slavery: A Norwegian's Experience in the Sandwich Islands". p. 3. Newspapers.com. Retrieved April 18, 2025.
- San Francisco Chronicle. (April 16, 1882). "Relief for the Slaves". p. 4. Newspapers.com. Retrieved April 18, 2025.
- San Francisco Chronicle. (May 11, 1882). "The Hawaiian Hades". p. 1. Newspapers.com. Retrieved April 18, 2025.
- San Francisco Chronicle. (May 27, 1882). "Confirming the Charge". p. 2. Newspapers.com. Retrieved April 18, 2025.
- Satrum, Jon (June 16, 2011). "A paper for the Norwegian-American Historical Association in Norway". Norwegian-American seminar XI. June 14–17, 2011. Decorah, Iowa. Retrieved April 23, 2025.
- Takaki, Ronald T. (1985)[1983]. Pau Hana: Plantation Life and Labor in Hawaii, 1835–1920. University of Hawaii Press. pp. 38–41. ISBN 9780824809560. OCLC 13847902.
- Thrum, Thomas George (1909). "Hawaiian Almanac and Annual for 1909". Thrum's Hawaiian Annual. p. 19. OCLC 1420101075.
- Treaty: Kingdom of Hawaii and Kingdoms of Sweden and Norway Hawai'i State Archives, Department of Accounting and General Services. 2025. Retrieved April 22, 2025.
- Valentine, K. M. (2014). Hilo. Arcadia Publishing. ISBN 9781467131261. OCLC 865494065.
- Williams, J. N. S. (1919). "Some of the factors in the industrial development of the Hawaiian Islands". Journal of the Royal Society of Arts. 67 (3479): 571–579. (subscription required)
- Wilson, Christie (January 26, 2006). "A past nearly forgotten". Honolulu Advertiser. Retrieved April 19, 2025.
