= University of Minnesota basketball scandal =

1990s rules violations

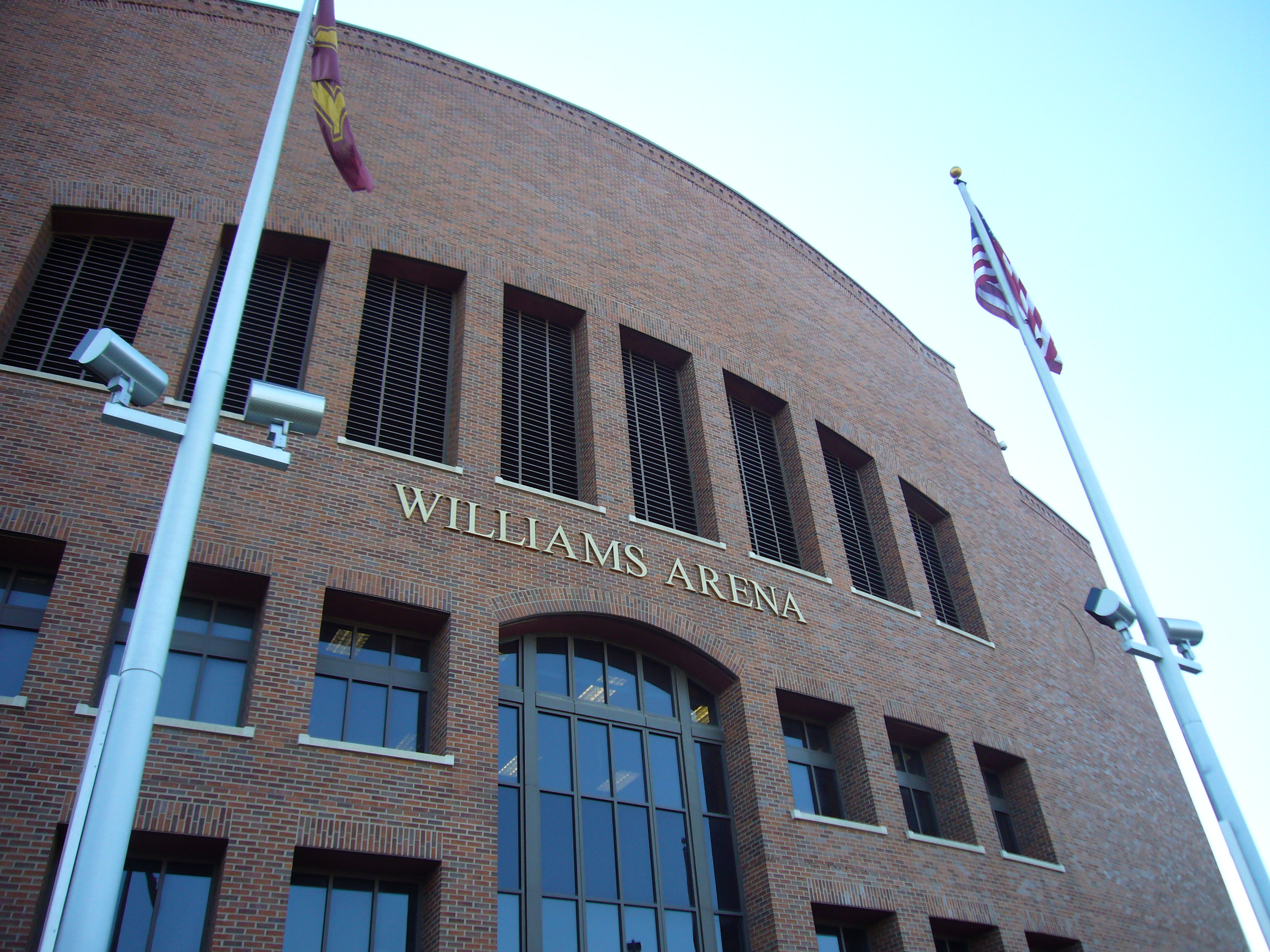
Williams Arena is the home of Minnesota Golden Gophers men's basketball.

The University of Minnesota basketball scandal involved National Collegiate Athletic Association (NCAA) rules violations, most notably academic dishonesty, committed by the University of Minnesota men's basketball program. The story broke the day before the 1999 NCAA Tournament, when the St. Paul Pioneer Press reported that Minnesota academic counseling office manager Jan Gangelhoff had done coursework for at least 20 Minnesota basketball players since 1993.

In the resulting scandal, four players from the Minnesota basketball team were immediately suspended, pending an investigation for academic fraud. Head coach Clem Haskins, men's athletic director Mark Dienhart, and university vice president McKinley Boston all resigned. Minnesota voluntarily sat out the 1999–2000 postseason, among other self-imposed sanctions. In 2000, the NCAA placed the Minnesota men's basketball program on four years' probation and reduced scholarships, based on numerous findings of academic fraud, improper benefits, and other ethics violations.

== St. Paul Pioneer Press reporting ==
On March 10, 1999, the day before Minnesota was to play in the first round of the NCAA Tournament, the St. Paul Pioneer Press reported, in an article by George Dohrmann, that Jan Gangelhoff, an office manager of the university academic counseling unit, alleged that she had completed hundreds of pieces of coursework for more than 20 Minnesota men's basketball players. According to Dohrmann, former players including Courtney James and Bobby Jackson corroborated Gangelhoff's claims. Gangelhoff provided him with printed samples of coursework written by her and turned in by students. Among other allegations by Gangelhoff: she was allowed to continue assisting players despite being caught in 1996 doing a take-home exam with a player, an assistant coach drove players to Gangelhoff's home for tutoring sessions in possible violation of NCAA rules, Gangelhoff duplicated the same work for different student-athletes to turn in to different classes, and coach Clem Haskins paid Gangelhoff in cash to tutor players.

Immediately after the Pioneer Press reported this story, the University of Minnesota began an investigation, suspending four players for the NCAA Tournament: starters Kevin Clark and Miles Tarver, and reserves Antoine Broxsie and Jason Stanford, alleged as among those for whom Gangelhoff had done work. Minnesota lost to Gonzaga in the first round of the tournament on March 11. Minnesota governor Jesse Ventura accused the Pioneer Press of timing the article to be published around NCAA Tournament time for the sake of "sensationalism journalism." The newspaper received many hostile calls and letters in response to this report.

After the March 10 article, two more people came forward claiming to have done coursework for Minnesota basketball players: Gangelhoff's sister Jeanne Payer and Alexandra Goulding, a Minnesota sociology doctoral candidate. In a Pioneer Press article published on March 24, 1999, Goulding said that she wrote a paper for Minnesota starting forward Courtney James in 1995. After telling coach Haskins that she would never do student-athletes' assignments again, Goulding said Haskins responded: "[James] needed a lot of help."

== NCAA investigation and findings ==
On October 24, 2000, the NCAA published its public infractions report relating to University of Minnesota men's basketball. Among its findings of rules violations:

- Gangelhoff prepared nearly 400 pieces of coursework for at least 18 basketball players;
- Alonzo Newby, the academic counselor assigned to men's basketball at Minnesota, orchestrated the academic fraud;
- Head coach Clem Haskins knew about Gangelhoff's fraudulent activities, and improperly provided benefits to Gangelhoff and Newby;
- In 1986, an academics counselor quoted Haskins in a memo as saying: "If someone doing a paper for a student-athlete would allow him the opportunity to be eligible to compete and therefore succeed, we need to do the paper for him;"
- The academic counselor and other basketball staffers intimidated professors and registrar staff into changing grades for student-athletes to maintain eligibility.

Additionally, the NCAA discovered that Haskins and other staffers had provided improper benefits to recruits and student-athletes, including cash payments made to student-athletes. Rules violations extended to football and men's ice hockey student-athletes, as well.

== Sanctions ==
=== Self-imposed ===
Following an internal investigation launched on March 19, 1999, the university self-imposed the following sanctions on its men's basketball program, among others:

- Withdrawing from postseason consideration for the 1999-2000 season;
- A reduction of three scholarships for the 1999–2000 season and a total of four scholarships reduced from the 2000–01 and 2003–04 seasons;
- Forfeiture of 90% of money earned from appearances in the 1994, 1995, and 1997 NCAA Tournaments.

On June 25, 1999, Minnesota forced Haskins to resign, and bought out his contract for $1.5 million. It hired Gonzaga head coach Dan Monson a month later to replace Haskins. This was four months after Monson's Bulldogs beat Minnesota in the NCAA Tournament. On November 19, 1999, the same day that Minnesota released its report of its internal investigation of the scandal, Minnesota president Mark Yudof forced the resignations of vice president McKinley Boston and men's athletic director Mark Dienhart.

Three years later, on May 13, 2002, Hennepin County District Judge Deborah Hedlund ordered Haskins to return $815,000 of the $1.5 million buyout. This was based on an arbitrator's recommendation, after the university argued that Haskins had committed fraud by lying to the NCAA yet accepting the buyout.

=== NCAA ===
Following its investigation, the NCAA issued the following sanctions to the university:

- Four years of probation until October 23, 2004;
- A reduction of five scholarships in total until the 2003–04 season;
- A reduction of six paid visits by recruits until the 2002–03 season;
- Vacating all appearances in the 1994, 1995, and 1997 NCAA Tournaments and 1996 and 1998 National Invitational Tournaments, as well as individual records of those student-athletes found to have committed academic fraud; and
- Show-cause penalties for Haskins and Newby (both until October 23, 2007) and Gangelhoff (until October 23, 2005).

Shortly afterward, the Big Ten stripped the Gophers of the 1997 regular season title and vacated all of the Gophers' victories from 1993 to 1999.

==== Extension of probation ====
In July 2002, the NCAA found Minnesota Golden Gophers women's basketball liable for multiple rule violations regarding practice time and benefits that occurred under the watch of then-head coach Cheryl Littlejohn from 1998 to 2001. Because the NCAA treated the women's basketball violations as a separate matter from the men's basketball academic violations, Minnesota avoided being designated a repeat violator and getting the "death penalty" for the women's basketball program. Instead, the NCAA extended the existing probationary period until 2006.

== Aftermath ==
Broxsie transferred to Oklahoma State after the spring 1999 semester.

In 2000, Dohrmann won the Pulitzer Prize for beat reporting for his reports on the scandal. According to Geneva Overholser of the Project for Excellence in Journalism, "the closeness of the sports writing community, Dohrmann and his editor knew, meant that others would be quite ready to turn on them if their work fingered some of the Twin Cities' most beloved figures."

Minnesota finished its first season under NCAA probation 18–14, including an appearance in the 2001 NIT. In November 2001, the Star Tribune reported that new coach Monson "rebuilt" the Minnesota men's basketball program after the scandal "faster than seemed possible." Minnesota made the NIT again in 2002 and 2003 and next made the NCAA Tournament in 2005.

Haskins worked as a scout for the Minnesota Timberwolves for a year after leaving the University of Minnesota. He then retired to his farm in Campbellsville, Kentucky. Dienhart became an executive at US Bank after resigning as men's athletic director. He returned to higher education in 2001 as senior vice president for institutional advancement at his alma mater, the University of St. Thomas in Saint Paul, Minnesota. He was later appointed as executive vice president and chief operating officer, serving until 2013 when he went to a foundation. From 2004 to 2014, Boston was athletic director at New Mexico State University.
