= Beta (1864 barque) =

Sailing vessel (1864–1893)

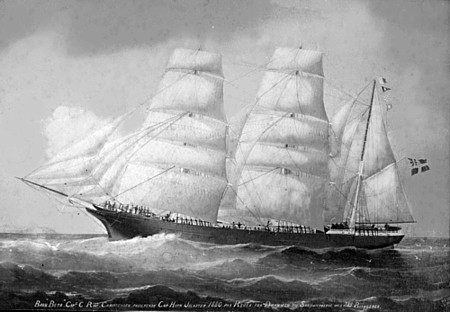
- Beta, 1880.

History
- Name: Sir John Lawrence (1864–79); Tonnes Christian (1879–80); Beta (1880–93)
- Namesake: Sir John Lawrence
- Owner: Rose & Co. (1864–79); R. Birkeland (1879–81); Aadals Brug (1881–83); Winge & Co. (1883–93)
- Port of registry: (United Kingdom of Great Britain and Ireland) Aberdeen, United Kingdom (1864–79); Christiania, Norway (1879–93)
- Builder: John Duthie, Sons & Co.
- Launched: 5 April 1864
- Maiden voyage: 1 July 1864
- In service: May 1864
- Identification: United Kingdom Official Number 48853 (1864–79); Code Letters TVLR ( –1879); Code Letters HFNP (1879–93)
- Fate: Wrecked 19 May 1893

General characteristics
- Class & type: Clipper (1864–79); Merchantman (1879–93)
- Tonnage: 879 or 883 GRT, 845 NRT
- Length: 186 feet 0 inches (56.69 m)
- Beam: 32 feet 1 inch (9.78 m)
- Depth: 20 feet 4 inches (6.20 m)
- Propulsion: Sails
- Sail plan: Full-rigged ship (1864–78); Barque (1878–93)
- Complement: 29 (1865)

Beta was a barque built in 1864 by John Duthie, Sons & Co., Aberdeen, United Kingdom as the full-rigged ship Sir John Lawrence. She was sold to Norway in 1878, re-rigged as a barque, and renamed Tonnes Kristian. She was renamed Beta in 1880, serving until she was wrecked in the Magdalen Islands in 1893.

== Description ==
The ship was 186 feet 0 inches (56.69 m) long, with a beam of 32 feet 1 inch (9.78 m) and a depth of 20 feet 4 inches (6.20 m). She was rigged as a full-rigged ship and was carvel built. She was assessed at 879, or 883 GRT, 845 NRT.

== History ==
Sir John Lawrence was built by John Duthie, Sons & Co., Footdee, Aberdeen, United Kingdom. She was launched on 5 April 1864 and completed the next month. Described as a clipper, she was built for Rose & Co. (Alexander, Charles, James and William Rose), Aberdeen. The United Kingdom Official Number 48853 was allocated. Her crew comprised 29 people.

Sir John Lawrence traded between the United Kingdom and Australia. She departed from London on 1 July 1864 for Sydney, New South Wales. She arrived on 3 October. Sir John Lawrence departed from Sydney for London on 6 December. She arrived at The Downs on 23 March 1865.

Sir John Lawrence departed from London for Sydney in May 1865. She arrived at the Sydney Heads on 2 August. She departed from Sydney for London on 16 November. She carried eleven passengers, and a cargo comprising 15,000oz of gold, 2,700 bales of wool and 15,000 hides. She had arrived at London by February 1866, when she was reported to be loading for Sydney.

Sir John Lawrence departed from London for Sydney in mid-February 1866. She arrived on 13 July. She sailed for London in late October. She arrived at Gravesend, Kent on 29 December.

Sir John Lawrence sailed from London for Sydney on 14 March 1867. She arrived on 12 June. She sailed for London on 24 July. On 1 August, she departed from Melbourne, New South Wales with a cargo that included 62,000oz of gold, valued at £250,000, reported to be the most valuable cargo consigned to a sailing ship. Other cargo included 1,746 bales of wool, 250 bales of cotton, 600 long tons (610 t) of wheat, and 1,200 pieces of copper. She arrived at her destination on 8 November.

Sir John Lawrence sailed for Sydney in early January 1868, passing Deal, Kent on 7 January. She arrived at Sydney on 20 April. On 13 May, captain Cargill of the Ben Lomond was married at Sydney. Ben Lomond, Nineveh and Sir John Lawrence were dressed overall to celebrate the occasion. Sir John Lawrence sailed from Sydney for London on 2 June. Her cargo consisted of coconut oil, copper, cotton, gum, hair, hides, meat tallow, wool and sundries. She arrived at London on 6 September.

Sir John Lawrence sailed from London for Sydney in late October 1868, passing Deal on 31 October. She arrived on 3 February 1869. Sir John Lawrence sailed for London on 22 May, having eleven passengers on board. She arrived at Gravesend on 13 August.

Sir John Lawrence departed from London on 27 October 1869. She arrived at Sydney on 22 January 1870. On 9 February, a fire occurred at a warehouse on the Circular Quay. Captain Fernie, master of Sir John Lawrence, assisted in directing volunteer firefighters fighting the fire, as did captain Elmslie of the Sobraon. A large quantity of wool was burnt. The fire was attributed to a quantity of flax, which had been due to be shipped on board Sir John Lawrence, spontaneously igniting. The fire raised questions for the insurers of the wool, as bills of lading had been signed before the wool had been loaded on board ship, as was the common practice at the time. Sir John Lawrence departed from Sydney for London on 23 March. Her cargo included 152 cases of extracts of meat, 418 casks of tallow, 200 hogsheads of treacle and 2,621 bales of wool. She arrived at London on 7 July.

Sir John Lawrence departed from London for Sydney on 2 October 1870. She arrived on 19 January 1871. She sailed for London on 1 March with two passengers on board. Her cargo included 730 casks of butter, 4,814 ingots of copper, 35 1/2 tons of copra, 1,809 hides, 432 casks of tallow and 2,532 bales of wool. On 11 March, her rudder was damaged. She put back to Sydney, arriving on 16 March. A new rudder was fitted and she sailed on 26 March. She arrived at Deal on 4 July.

Sir John Lawrence sailed from Gravesend for Sydney on 22 August 1871. She arrived on 27 November. Amongst her cargo were two rams, twenty ewes and seven pigs bound for the Hunter River area. Amongst her cargo were two cases of French clocks, and a consignment of theodolites. She departed for London on 30 December. A crew member deserted the ship; he was jailed for 3 months. Her cargo included 333 casks of coconut oil, 2,524 cakes of copper, 12 bales of cotton, 17 bales of skins, 477 casks of tallow, 2,551 bales of wool and various sundry cargo. She arrived at London on 20 April 1872.

Sir John Lawrence departed from London for Sydney on 6 July 1872. She arrived on 14 October. She sailed for London on 3 December. Her cargo included 33 bales of basils, 110 bales of leather, 102 cases of meats, a case of wood, a quarter cask and two cases of wine and 4,006 bales of wool. She arrived at London on 3 April 1873.

Sir John Lawrence sailed from London for Sydney on 9 June 1873. Amongst her cargo was a quantity of rails to be used in the construction of a new branch of the Tasmanian Main Line Company. She arrived on 16 September. Amongst her cargo were four bulls and three heifers, which were reported to have arrived in fine condition, and three Berkshire pigs. She departed from Sydney for London on 27 November. Amongst her cargo was 27 tons of copra, 7 bales of cotton, 335 casks of coconut oil, 2,105 ingots of copper, 2,100 cases of preserved meat, 30 casks of tallow, 789 slabs of tin, 114 casks of tin ore and 2,460 bales of wool. She arrived at London on 30 March.

Sir John Lawrence departed from London for Sydney on 6 June 1874. Amongst her cargo was a collection of paintings by various artists. She arrived on 10 September. Sir John Lawrence sailed on 18 December. She arrived on 29 April 1875.

Sir John Lawrence departed from London for Sydney on 27 June 1875. She arrived on 3 October. A sailor from the ship appeared in court on 25 October charged with being disorderly on board, and also with damaging doors and windows in a cabin. He was found guilty, and fined £2 or two days imprisonment on the first charge, and ordered to pay the value of the damages, £8, and to be imprisoned for two weeks with hard labour on the second charge. Another sailor from the ship appeared in court on 22 November charged with wilful disobedience of lawful commands. He was sentenced to three months imprisonment. On 2 December, she caught fire at Sydney. The ship was not much damaged, but 550 bales of wool were. The fire was believed to have been due to spontaneous combustion of oakum in the ship's store room, in the forecastle. Sir John Lawrence sailed for London on 24 December. She arrived at London on 20 April 1876.

Sir John Lawrence sailed from London on 31 July 1876. Amongst her cargo were 240 kegs and 20 casks of paint. She arrived at Adelaide on 12 November. By 1877, she had been allocated the Code Letters TVLR. She departed from Gravesend for Melbourne on 2 August 1878. She arrived on 13 November. She had been re-rigged as a barque. She sailed for London on 21 February 1879. She arrived at London on 16 June.

In 1879, Sir John Lawrence was sold to R. Birkeland, Christiania, Norway and renamed Tonnes Christian. The Code Letters HFNP were allocated. By 1880, she had been renamed Beta.

Beta sailed from Drammen, Norway, for the Hawaiian Islands on 27 October 1880. She carried almost 400 passengers: 327 adults, of which 49 were married couples, and 69 children who were under the age of 12. The passengers signed up to work three-year contracts on sugar plantations in Hawaii. They had been chosen for the voyage by Henrik Christian L’Orange. The trip was difficult; nine children died, but five babies were born on board the ship. The Beta arrived at Māʻalaea on the island of Maui on 18 February 1881. She was the first of three ships that would ultimately bring more than 600 Scandinavians, mostly Norwegians, but also Swedes and Danes, to work in the sugarcane industry as part of the Scandinavian migration to the Hawaiian Kingdom. (1880–1881).

In 1881, Beta was sold to Aadals Brug, Christiania. She was sold in 1883 to Winge & Co, Christiania. On 19 May 1893, Beta ran aground at Grande-Entrée, in the Magdalen Islands, Quebec, Dominion of Canada and was wrecked. She was on a voyage from Christiania to Bathurst, New Brunswick, Canada.
