= Lisa Giocomo =

American neuroscientist

- Born: Glenwood Springs, Colorado, U.S
- Education: Baylor University, Boston University
- Known for: Grid cells
- Scientific career
- Fields: Neuroscience
- Workplaces: Stanford University School of Medicine

Lisa Giocomo is an American neuroscientist who is a Professor of Neurobiology and Howard Hughes Medical Institute Investigator at Stanford University School of Medicine. Giocomo probes the molecular and cellular mechanisms underlying cortical neural circuits involved in spatial navigation and memory.

== Early life and education ==
Giocomo grew up in Highlands Ranch, Colorado reporting that she spent a lot of time outdoors. She attributed her early interest in science to her outdoor exploration as a child and thought that pursuing a career in medicine would satisfy her interest in science. Giocomo went on to pursue pre-medical training as an undergraduate student at Baylor University supported by an academic scholarship. Motivated to go into medicine, Giocomo then worked as a mental health counselor at a local clinic as well as at the Veterans Affairs Hospital where she also conducted research on psychiatric illnesses. Giocomo has stated that these research experiences and the experiments she was doing in her psychology class inspired her to major in Psychology. Giocomo shared that her realization about the lack of available treatment options for mental illnesses inspired by her psychology and statistics professor, Dr. Roger Kirk, and changed her path to pursue a deeper understanding of neurobiology instead of medicine.

Giocomo completed her bachelor's degree at Baylor in 2002, graduating with a degree in Psychology and then pursued a master's degree in Psychology at Boston University. Giocomo worked with Dr. Michael Hasselmo to understand how different neuromodulators impact memory processing. She stayed at Boston University to complete her PhD in neuroscience under the mentorship of Hasselmo. During her PhD, Giocomo published a first author paper in 2005 showing that application of nicotine to hippocampal slices modulates glutamatergic synaptic transmission leading to a longer period of enhanced synaptic transmission. These results might provide insight into the mechanisms through which nicotine has memory-enhancing effects.

After exploring the effects of cholinergic modulation on cortical function as well as the differences between metabotropic glutamate receptor modulatory effects on synaptic transmission, Giocomo began to study grid cells. Grid cells are cells in the cortex that exhibit spatially modulated firing fields that are repeated across the environment to continually update the animal of its position in space. In a first author paper published in Science, Giocomo found that grid cells exhibit differences in frequency of subthreshold membrane potential oscillations in the entorhinal cortex across the dorsal to ventral axis. These findings are in line with the Burgess and O’Keefe Model such that differences in the frequency of subthreshold somatic oscillations results in differences in spatial frequency of grid cell fields. Giocomo further explored the differences in intrinsic properties of medial entorhinal cortical grid cells across the dorsal to ventral axis and, in 2008, published another first author paper outlining how experimental data regarding the physiology of grid cells can be understood in the framework of two possible computational models of grid cells. She concluded that, taking into account the experimental data, both the attractor dynamics and oscillatory interference models help to explain the properties of grid cell firing in the entorhinal cortex.

Giocomo completed her PhD in 2008 and decided to pursue her postdoctoral studies in the Moser Lab where she could test her cellular and computational work from her graduate studies in animals and under the mentorship of the scientists that discovered grid cells. The lab was located at the Center for Neural Computation at the Norwegian University of Science and Technology, so she moved to Norway with her husband for her postdoctoral work. She spent four years in Norway working with the Mosers and published many influential papers that greatly impacted the grid cell field. In 2011, she found that knocking out specific channels in the entorhinal cortex, hyperpolarization-activated cyclic nucleotide-gated channels (HCN), caused the size and spacing of grid fields to expand but the dorsal-ventral gradient of the grid pattern was maintained. In addition to looking at other computational models of grid cells, Giocomo described the function of head direction cells in the entorhinal cortex in a first author paper in Cell. She found that head direction cells are organized topographically. Specifically, the tuning gradient of these cells decreases along the dorsal to ventral axis and the dorsoventral tuning gradient is only expressed in layer III of the entorhinal cortex. Overall, this paper highlighted the fundamental nature of dorsoventral gradients in entorhinal cortex circuits.

== Career and research ==
From 2011 to 2012, Giocomo held the title of Group Leader at the Kavli Institute for Systems Neuroscience at the Norwegian University of Science and Technology. Giocomo was then recruited to Stanford University in 2013 where she held the title of Assistant Professor of Neurobiology until 2018. The Giocomo Lab focuses on the neurobiology of functionally defined cell types in the entorhinal cortex. Studying grid cells, head direction cells and border cells allows Giocomo to perform specific manipulations in a system that offers measurable outputs.

In 2015, Giocomo and her lab discovered novel error correction mechanisms in grid cells. Since grid cells use path integrating in computing the neural representation of an animals location in space, Giocomo and her lab hypothesized that there must be a sort of error-correction mechanism in place in the brain otherwise the error would accumulate and animals would be unable to navigate their environments. They found that grid cells accumulate error relative to time and distance travelled, the error reflects coherent drift in the grid pattern, and lastly that border cells might serve as a neural substrate for error correction. Overall, these findings indicate that landmarks in an animals’ environment are crucial to grid stability. In 2018, Giocomo and her lab explored the impact of grid scale on place scale by knocking out the HCN1 channels to expand the grid scale. They observed that place scale also expanded in areas far from environmental boundaries, and that place field stability was reduced and spatial learning was impaired. These findings highlight the important biological connections between grid cells and place cells in place coding and spatial memory. In 2019, Giocomo's lab explored the malleability of entorhinal spatial maps. They found that the entorhinal maps restructure to incorporate learned reward locations and this restructuring improved positional decoding when the animal was in close proximity to the reward location.

Another goal of the Giocomo Lab's research program is to explore the ontogenesis of medial entorhinal cortex topography to understand how gradients in ion channels develop to give rise to spatial mapping and neural representations of space.

In 2019, Giocomo was promoted to Associate Professor of Neurobiology at Stanford University. In 2024, Giocomo was named a Howard Hughes Medical Institute Investigator, awarding her about $9 million in direct research support over a seven-year term.

== Awards and honors ==
- 2024 HHMI Investigator, Howard Hughes Medical Institute
- 2019 Vallee Scholar Award
- 2018 Office of Naval Research Young Investigator Award, Office of Naval Research
- 2018 Young Investigator Award, Society for Neuroscience
- 2016 James S McDonnell Foundation Scholar, James S McDonnell Foundation Scholar
- 2016 Medal of Service for Contributions to Research Baylor University
- 2015 Bio-X Affiliated Faculty, Scientific Leadership Council Member
- 2015 Robertson Neuroscience Investigator – New York Stem Cell Foundation, New York Stem Cell Foundation
- 2014 Klingenstein-Simons Fellowship Award in the Neurosciences, Klingenstein-Simons Foundation
- 2013 Sloan Fellow, Alfred P. Sloan Foundation
- 2012 Peter and Patricia Gruber International Research Award, The Gruber Foundation

== Select publications ==
- Topography in the bursting dynamics of entorhinal neurons. Bant JS, Hardcastle K, Ocko SA, Giocomo LM. Cell Reports. 2020;20:2349-2359
- Entorhinal velocity signals reflect environmental geometry. Munn RGK, Mallory CS, Hardcastle K, Chetkovich DM, Giocomo LM. Nature Neuroscience. 2020;23:239-251
- Remembered reward locations restructure entorhinal spatial maps. Butler WN*, Hardcastle K*, Giocomo LM. Science. 2019;363:1447-1452
- How a fly's neural compass adapts to an ever-changing world. Campbell MG, Giocomo LM. Nature. 2019;576:42-43
- The shifting sands of cortical divisions. Hardcastle K, Giocomo LM. Neuron. 2019;102:8-11
- Emergent elasticity in the neural code for space. Ocko SA, Hardcastle K, Giocomo LM, Ganguli S. PNAS. 2018;E11798-E11806
- Principles governing the integration of landmark and self-motion cues in entorhinal cortical codes for navigation. Campbell MG, Ocko SA, Mallory CS, Low IC, Ganguli S, Giocomo LM. Nature Neuroscience. 2018;21:1096-1106
- A multiplexed, heterogeneous, and adaptive code for navigation in medial entorhinal cortex. Hardcastle K, Maheswaranathan N, Ganguli S, Giocomo LM. Neuron. 2017;94:375-387
- Environmental boundaries as an error correction mechanism for grid cells. Hardcastle K, Ganguli S, Giocomo LM. Neuron. 2015;86:827–839
- Environmental boundaries as a mechanism for correcting and anchoring spatial maps. Giocomo LM. Journal of Physiology. 2016;594:6501-6511.
- Topography of head direction cells in medial entorhinal cortex. Giocomo LM, Stensola T, Bonnevie T, Van Cauter T, Moser MB, Moser EI. Current Biology. 2014;24(3):252-62.
- Temporal frequency of subthreshold oscillations scales with entorhinal grid cell field spacing. Giocomo LM, Zilli EA, Frans_n E, Hasselmo ME. Science. 2007;315(5819):1719-22.
- Nicotinic modulation of glutamatergic synaptic transmission in region CA3 of the hippocampus. Giocomo LM, Hasselmo ME. Eur J Neurosci. 2005;22(6):1349-56.
