= Kenneth H. Keller =

President of the University of Minnesota (1985-1988)

12th President of the University of Minnesota
- In office 1985–1988
- Preceded by: C. Peter Magrath
- Succeeded by: Nils Hasselmo

Personal details
- Born: October 19, 1934 (age 91) New York City, U.S.
- Education: Johns Hopkins University; Columbia University
- Profession: Scientist, professor, and university administrator
- Known for: Public policy Fluid mechanics Transport phenomena
- Awards: Twin Citian of the Year (1987), National Academy of Engineering (2002)
- Scientific career
- Fields: Chemical engineering Public policy
- Workplaces: University of Minnesota; Columbia University; Princeton University
- Doctoral advisor: Sheldon Friedlander

Kenneth Harrison Keller (born October 19, 1934) is professor emeritus and former president of the University of Minnesota (1985–1988). He was the first Jewish president of the university. He was elected a member of the National Academy of Engineering in 2002.

== Early life and education ==
Keller was born and grew up in New York City. In 1956, he earned a B.A., liberal arts, from Columbia University. One year later in 1957, he earned a B.S. chemical engineering from Columbia University. He then continued his education at Johns Hopkins University with a M.S.E. in chemical engineering in 1963 and Ph.D. in chemical engineering in 1964. He completed his Ph.D. thesis in 1964 with the title, The Steady State Transport of Oxygen Through Hemoglobin Solutions.

== Professor and dean ==
Keller joined the department of chemical engineering at the University of Minnesota in 1964. He became chair of the biomedical engineering program (1971–1973). He served as associated dean (1973–1974) and acting dean (1974–1975) of the graduate school. In 1978, he became the head of the department of chemical engineering and materials science. From 1980 until 1984, he served as vice president for academic affairs.

== President of the University of Minnesota ==
Keller served as the 12th president of the University of Minnesota from 1985 to 1988. As leader of the University, Keller organized a set of objectives as part a framework called the "Commitment to Focus". He also initiated a campaign to raise $300 million in external funds. After the completion of the three-year campaign, the University had raised more than $365 million from more than 63,000 donations in 1987–1988 alone. In early 1988, Keller came under fire for spending millions of dollars for renovations to the president's residence, Eastcliff, and his presidential office, much of it without proper authorization from the board of regents. Most of the money came from a secret reserve fund whose existence was unknown to regents and legislators. Students, legislators and regents called for Keller's resignation. After conferring with Governor Rudy Perpich, Keller stepped down as president on March 13, 1988.

== Focus on public policy ==
Keller has served as Senior Adjunct Professor of Science and Technology Policy at the Johns Hopkins School of Advanced International Studies' (SAIS). He served as Director of SAIS Europe (previously known as the SAIS Bologna Center) in Bologna, Italy from 2006 until 2014. He held the position of Charles M. Denny Jr., Professor of Science, Technology and Public Policy at the university's Hubert H. Humphrey Institute of Public Affairs, where he founded the Center for Science, Technology & Public Policy. His distinguished career at the university spanned nearly 35 years, culminating with his role as the university's 12th president from 1985 to 1988. He also served as vice president for academic affairs from 1980 to 1985 and before that held other leadership positions.

Keller has been a member of the Whiting School of Engineering's national advisory council and the department of chemical engineering's board of visitors. Keller is also president emeritus of the University of Minnesota.

== Honors and legacy ==
In 2002, Keller was elected to the National Academy of Engineering, primary section (Bioengineering), secondary section (Chemical). His election citation states:

For leadership in applying quantitative engineering analysis to vascular transport and artificial organ design and in public policy ...

— Election Citation, National Academy of Engineering

In 1996, Keller received Johns Hopkins University's Distinguished Alumnus Award. On July 1, 2010, the Electrical Engineering and Computer Science Building at the University of Minnesota was renamed Kenneth H. Keller Hall, honoring him for his dedication to science and technology as the 12th president of the University.

== Selected works ==
- "The American Research University: Time for Some Course Corrections", in University in Transition (1998). Page 49. Detlef et al, Gutersloh: Bertlesmann Foundation Publishers Editors, Muller-Boling, Detlef et al, Gutersloh: Bertelsmann Foundation Publishers.
- "The Effects of Information Technology on the Role and Authority of Government," (1997) Washington, D.C., National Research Council Report.
- "Exporting U.S. High Tech: Facts and Fiction About the Globalization of Industrial R&D", (1997), (with B. Callan and S. Costigan), New York: Council on Foreign Relations.

== See also ==
- List of presidents of the University of Minnesota

Academic offices
Preceded by C. Peter Magrath	12th President of the University of Minnesota; 1985 — 1988	Succeeded by Nils Hasselmo
