= McKinley Boston =

American football player and coach, college athletics administrator

No. 82
- Positions: Defensive end, Linebacker

Personal information
- Born: November 5, 1945 (age 81); Elizabeth City, North Carolina, U.S.
- Listed height: 6 ft 2 in (1.88 m)
- Listed weight: 250 lb (113 kg)

Career information
- High school: P.W. Moore (Elizabeth City)
- College: Minnesota (1964-1967)
- NFL draft: 1968: 15th round, 396th overall pick

Career history

Playing
- New York Giants (1968–1969); Long Island Bulls (1970)

Operations
- Kean (1986-1987) Athletic director; Rhode Island (1989-1991) Athletic director; Minnesota (1991-1995) Athletic director; New Mexico State (2004-2014) Athletic director

Awards and highlights
- First-team All-Big Ten (1967)

Career NFL statistics
- Fumble recoveries: 4
- Sacks: 4.5
- Stats at Pro Football Reference

McKinley Boston Jr. (born November 5, 1945) is an American university administrator.

Boston is from Elizabeth City, North Carolina and graduated from P. W. Moore High School in 1964. He attended the University of Minnesota from 1964 to 1968 where he played football. Boston went on to play professionally for the New York Giants in the National Football League (NFL) and for the BC Lions in the Canadian Football League (CFL) for two years.

Boston received his bachelor's degree in 1973 and his master's degree in 1974 from Montclair State University. He received his doctorate in education in 1987 from New York University.

Boston served as director of athletics at Kean College in Union, New Jersey (1986–1987) and University of Rhode Island (1989–1991).

Boston was named the AD at the University of Minnesota in 1991 and in 1995 he became vice president for student development and athletics at Minnesota. He left the University of Minnesota in 1999, along with then-men's athletic director Mark Dienhart, in connection with the release by the university of a report on an academic cheating scandal involving the men's basketball program.

Boston was athletic director at New Mexico State University. He was named athletics director on December 14, 2004, and retired effective December 31, 2014.
