= Michael Hasselmo =

American neuroscientist

- Born: November 12, 1962 (age 64); Golden Valley, (Minnesota)
- Citizenship: United States
- Education: Harvard University; University of Oxford
- Awards: Rhodes Scholarship (1984); Office of Naval Research Young Investigator Award (1993); Hebb Award from International Neural Network Society (2015)
- Scientific career
- Fields: Neuroscience, Psychology
- Workplaces: Boston University
- Thesis: Representation and storage of visual information in the temporal lobe. (1988)
- Website: Website at Boston University

Michael Hasselmo is an American neuroscientist and professor in the Department of Psychological and Brain Sciences at Boston University. He is the director of the Center for Systems Neuroscience and is editor-in-chief of Hippocampus (journal). Hasselmo studies oscillatory dynamics and neuromodulatory regulation in cortical mechanisms for memory guided behavior and spatial navigation using a combination of neurophysiological and behavioral experiments in conjunction with computational modeling. In addition to his peer-reviewed publications, Hasselmo wrote the book How We Remember: Brain Mechanisms of Episodic Memory.

== Education and early life ==
Hasselmo grew up in Golden Valley, Minnesota. His father Nils Hasselmo was a professor of Scandinavian languages and literature, and later the president of the University of Minnesota and the president of the Association of American Universities (AAU). Hasselmo graduated summa cum laude in 1984 from Harvard University with a special concentration in behavioral neuroscience. At the University of Oxford, he completed a DPhil from the Department of Experimental Psychology in 1988 based on unit recording of face-responsive neurons in the monkey temporal lobe.

Hasselmo is married to Professor Chantal Stern and father of two children.

== Career and research ==
From 1988 to 1991, Hasselmo completed a postdoctoral fellowship in the Division of Biology at the California Institute of Technology where he published work on modulatory mechanisms in cortical brain slice preparations. Following his post-doc, Hasselmo was an associate professor at Harvard University studying the cholinergic modulation of synaptic transmission and spike frequency accommodation in cortical structures. He demonstrated that acetylcholine sets appropriate cortical dynamics for the encoding of new information. He is best known for his work on neuromodulators, particularly acetylcholine and for his computational modeling work on the hippocampus and prefrontal cortex, especially regarding the functional role of theta rhythm.

In his current role as the director of the Center for Systems Neuroscience at Boston University, his laboratory studies the oscillatory dynamics of the retrosplenial cortex (e.g., egocentric boundary cells and head direction cells), the entorhinal cortex (e.g., grid cells, head direction cells, and speed modulated cells) and the hippocampus (e.g., time cells, place cells and context-dependent splitter cells). Additionally, Hasselmo's modeling work include network level models and detailed biophysical models. Publications from the lab address the function of theta rhythm oscillations in the encoding of information in the hippocampus and related cortical structures, building on his earlier models of the role of acetylcholine in regulating mechanisms of encoding and consolidation.

Notable lab alumni include Prof. Mark Brandon, Prof. Thom Cleland, Prof. Holger Dannenberg, Prof. Amy Griffin, Prof. Lisa Giocomo, Prof. James Heys, Prof. Marc Howard, Prof. Jake Hinman and many more.

== Awards and honors ==
Hasselmo is on the editorial board of a number of scientific journals, including Hippocampus, Neurobiology of Learning and Memory, and Behavioral Neuroscience. Previously, Hasselmo was on the editorial board of Science. Prior to attending University of Oxford, Hasselmo received a Rhodes scholarship. In 2003, Hasselmo was President of the International Neural Network Society (INNIS); he served on the board prior to and after holding the presidential position. Additionally Hasselmo was elected to the American Academy of Arts and Sciences in 2018 and as a fellow of the American Association for the Advancement of Science (AAAS) in 2011. He's received the Hebb Award from the International Neural Network Society recognizing achievement in Biological Learning, and was appointed as a William Fairfield Warren Distinguished Professor.
