= Christiane Linster =

Luxembourg-born behavioral neuroscientist

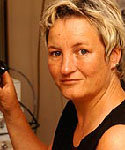
- Born: 1962 (age 63–64); Luxembourg
- Education: University of Music and Performing Arts, Graz; Graz University of Technology (Dipl.-Ing.); Pierre and Marie Curie University (PhD)
- Known for: Research in neuromodulation as it relates to learning and memory, using the olfactory system of rodents as a model
- Spouse: Thomas A. "Thom" Cleland
- Children: 5
- Scientific career
- Fields: Neuroscientist; Behavioral Neuroscience
- Workplaces: Graz University of Technology; ESPCI Electronics Laboratory; Department of Psychology, Harvard University; Department of Psychology, Boston University; Department of Neurobiology and Behavior, Cornell University

Christiane Linster is a Luxembourg-born behavioral neuroscientist and a professor in the Department of Neurobiology and Behavior at Cornell University. Her work focuses on neuromodulation along with learning and memory, using the olfactory system of rodents as a model. Her lab integrates behavioral, electrophysiological, and computational work. Linster was the founding President of the Organization for Computational Neurosciences (OCNS), which was created to coordinate and lead the annual meeting of aspiring and senior computational neuroscientists. Linster served as president of the OCNS from 2003 until 2005 when she was replaced by her successor Ranu Jung.

As of 2000, Linster co-directs (with Thomas Cleland) the Computational Neurophysiology Lab in the Department of Neurobiology and Behavior at Cornell University. She teaches a classes in Systems and Computational Neuroscience, Programming for Neuroscience and Introduction to Neuroscience. Linster is completely fluent in English, French, and German (as well as Luxembourgish), which broadened her horizons for her professional career.

== Education and teaching experience ==
Christiane Linster was born in Luxembourg in 1962 where she remained for her childhood and obtained her high school degree from the Lycee des Garcons Luxembourg. In 1982 she studied clarinet at the University of Music and Performing Arts, Graz in Austria, as well as Electrical Engineering at the Graz University of Technology (TU Graz). She graduated in 1987 with a Certificate in Classical Clarinet and Conducting as well as a Masters in Electrical Engineering and published her senior thesis entitled "Get Rhythm: A Musical Application for Neural Networks".

In 1989, Linster accepted a position as a research fellow in the Department of Biomedical Engineering at Graz University of Technology. While she was conducting research at TU Graz (1989-1990), she also assisted in the instruction of an optical communications lab and a course-lab combination in Neural Networks. From 1990 to 1993, she studied as a graduate student and worked as a teaching fellow in the Electronics Lab at ESPCI in Paris, France. During this time, she also worked towards her PhD at Pierre and Marie Curie University, in Paris. She graduated with a PhD in applied physics in 1993 and was named Assistant Professor of the ESPCI Electronics Laboratory in the same year. Linster only held the assistant professor position in the ESPCI Electronics Lab for two years before moving to the United States to assume a post-doctoral research position with Michael Hasselmo at Harvard University. From 1998 to 2000, Linster lectured for the Department of Psychology at Harvard University before becoming an assistant professor and eventually a professor of the Department of Neurobiology and Behavior at Cornell University where she remains today.

== Professional career and research ==
Linster focuses largely on research for most of her professional career, although she has aided in the instruction of a few courses and labs at multiple universities. While working at ESPCI, she had a hand in publishing many articles that focused on pheromone recognition based on relative concentrations of major and minor molecular components in the pheromones themselves.

From 1995 to 2000, while Linster held the post-doctoral position with Michael Hasselmo at Harvard University, and broadened her research into the computational roles of neuromodulation. She also began seeking out a possible physiological pathway for the proposed regulation of neural activity in the horizontal limb of the diagonal band of Broca (HDB) by activity in the olfactory bulb or cerebral cortex of the brain.

Most of Linster's work has been undertaken since she was named an assistant professor (and later professor) of the Department for Neurobiology and Behavior at Cornell University in 2000. She has continued to contribute to multiple scientific articles and is still making advances in research into how various neuromodulators affect olfactory information.

Linster's recent research has shown that neuromodulators such as acetylcholine and norepinephrine, the two main neuromodulators for olfactory sensory processing in the adult main olfactory bulb (OB), aid in discrimination between chemically similar odorants in cannulated rats. The rats showed a reduction in spontaneous discrimination between similar odors when nicotinic acetylcholine receptors were blocked, and they showed a significant enhancement in spontaneous discrimination when the efficacy of cholinergic inputs was increased by unblocking these receptors. However, when the rats were observed during reward-motivated odor-discrimination tasks, the difference in cholinergic uptake by nicotinic receptors produced no significant behavioral changes. Linster's findings show that the OB is a highly plastic structure that is directly modulated by olfactory experience and the perception of odors. This plasticity of the OB in turn leads to behavioral changes based on how an odor is processed and paired with reward associations. Linster took these studies further by examining how neural mechanisms such as these play a role in habituation and olfactory memory based on different periods of exposure to odors.

== Personal life ==
Linster married Thomas A. "Thom" Cleland, Associate Professor of Psychology at Cornell University, on October 3, 1998. They have five daughters named Linsey, Haley, Jasmine, Anna and Delma, and live in the small village of Freeville, New York.

Linster and Cleland share a common interest in the olfactory system, and as a result publish many articles together covering everything from the importance of computation and predictive models in olfaction to their findings related to memory and behavior based on cholinergic neuromodulation in the olfactory bulb.

== Personal statement ==
"In my research, I focus on the neural basis of sensory information processing, using olfaction as a model system. I am primarily interested in the relationship between perceptual qualities, as measured by behavioral experiments, and neural activity patterns, as observed electrophysiologically. My present work concerns how the central nervous system neuromodulators acetylcholine and noradrenaline, both of which have been implicated in memory deficits such as those symptomatic of Alzheimer’s disease, influence the representation and storage of olfactory information. This approach necessitates coordinated behavioral and electrophysiological experiments based on predictive theories."
