= Chantal Stern =

Neuroscientist

Chantal Stern is a neuroscientist who uses techniques including functional magnetic resonance imaging (fMRI) to study the brain mechanisms of memory function. She is the Director of the Brain, Behavior and Cognition program and a professor of Psychological and Brain Sciences at Boston University. After completing a degree at McGill University, she performed her doctoral research at Oxford University with Richard Passingham.

Stern earned a DPhil in Experimental Psychology from Oxford University and a BA in psychology from McGill University.

== Imaging of hippocampal activation during encoding ==
Stern published the earliest functional magnetic resonance imaging study showing robust increases in blood flow to the hippocampus during memory encoding. Prior to this study, imaging studies did not observe robust changes in hippocampus during verbal memory tasks, but this study demonstrated clear increases in blood flow during encoding of complex novel visual scenes. This result was subsequently replicated in numerous studies demonstrating activity in the hippocampus and associated parahippocampal cortical regions during encoding of new information, including work showing that the magnitude of hippocampal activity during encoding of stimuli correlates with recognition of stimuli in subsequent memory tests.

== Medial temporal lobe activity during working memory for novel stimuli ==
Stern demonstrated that holding novel visual scenes in working memory involves activation of medial temporal lobe structures. This activation of medial temporal lobe for novel visual scenes contrasted with activation for familiar visual scenes that primarily appeared in the prefrontal cortex and parietal cortex, which were the focus of most previous fMRI studies of working memory function for familiar stimuli. Subsequent data supports this finding, including work showing impairments of working memory for novel stimuli caused by medial temporal lobe damage. In subsequent work, Stern linked this medial temporal lobe activity to mechanisms of persistent spiking shown in individual neurons.

== Hyperactivity in the hippocampus in presymptomatic familial Alzheimer's disease ==
Research in the Stern laboratory has addressed a range of clinical disorders, including HIV dementia, Parkinson's dementia and Alzheimer's disease. In research with Yakeel Quiroz, Stern showed higher fMRI signal (hyperactivity) in the hippocampal formation in young subjects with a mutation of the presenilin1 gene that results in familial Alzheimer's disease.
