= Ann Die Hasselmo =

American college president

President of Hendrix College
- In office 1992–2001

Personal details
- Spouse: Nils Hasselmo (d. 2019)
- Education: Lamar University; Texas A&M University
- Occupation: Academic administrator; psychologist; university president

Ann Die Hasselmo was president of Hendrix College from 1992 to 2001, and served as chair of the National Association of Independent Colleges and Universities (NAICU). She is a former president of the American Academic Leadership Institute.

== Biography ==
Ann Die Hasselmo graduated summa cum laude from Lamar University, and received a Ph.D. in counseling psychology from Texas A&M University. She became a Regents Professor at Lamar University, where she also served as President of the Faculty Senate. In 1986–87, Dr. Hasselmo was one of 29 Fellows of the American Council on Education and spent the administrative internship year in the President's office at the College of William and Mary. In 1988, she moved to Tulane University, where she was Dean of the H. Sophie Newcomb Memorial College and Associate Provost and Chair of the Newcomb Foundation's board of trustees.

== Presidency ==
In 1992, Ann Die Hasselmo was appointed president of Hendrix College where she served until 2001. During her tenure as president of Hendrix, she served as chair of the board of directors of the National Association of Independent Colleges and Universities (NAICU) and represented NAICU on the board of directors of the American Council on Education (ACE). She also served as chair of the ACE's Council of Fellows and the Commission on Governmental Relations and served on the board of directors of the National Merit Scholarship Corporation and the Foundation for Independent Higher Education. She was Chair of the Presidents Council for Division III of the National Collegiate Athletic Association (NCAA), and was a member of the executive committee of the NCAA.

== Recent positions ==
Hasselmo went on to be managing director of Academic Search Consultation Service (ASCS) and in 2012 was President of the American Academic Leadership Institute (AALI) in Washington, D.C. She also sat on the board of Acxiom Corporation.

In 2024, she is a senior advisor at Academic Search.

== Awards ==
In 2014, Hasselmo received the annual Distinguished Service Award from the Council of Independent Colleges and the Annual Distinguished Leadership and Service in Higher Education Award from the American Association of State Colleges and Universities.

In 2024, she won the Allen P. Splete Award for Outstanding Service.

A scholarship at Lamar University is named after Hasselmo.

== Family ==
Hasselmo was married to Nils Hasselmo, the former president of the University of Minnesota, until his death in 2019.
