= Mark Dienhart =

American athlete and administrator (born 1953)

Mark Dienhart (born October 11, 1953) is an American educational administrator who is the former Senior Vice President at the University of St. Thomas. He was the men's athletic director at the University of Minnesota from 1995 to 2000. He is currently the president and CEO of the Richard M. Schulze Family Foundation.

Dienhart attended DeLaSalle High School in Minneapolis and was a multi-sport athlete in college at St. Thomas. He was the Division III National Champion in the shot put at St. Thomas, the first individual national championship in school history. He was an offensive lineman on the football team and was drafted by the Buffalo Bills in the 1975 NFL draft. Dienhart coached football and track at St. Thomas from 1981 to 1986 and led the Tommies to the 1985 Division III Indoor National Championship.

Dienhart served as the Minnesota Golden Gophers men's athletics director from 1995 until 2000, when his contract was not renewed following the academic scandal in the men's basketball program under head coach Clem Haskins.

Dienhart joined the administration at St. Thomas in 2001. At St. Thomas, Dienhart was in charge of increasing the university's endowment.

On June 17, 2013, St. Thomas reported Dienhart will be leaving the institution to become president and chief executive officer of the Schulze Family Foundation, created by Best Buy founder and University of St. Thomas trustee, Dick Schulze. The following day, Dick Schulze announced his intention to expand the size of the foundation from $100 million to $1 billion.
