= Nils Hasselmo =

President of the University of Minnesota (1988-1997)

- Hasselmo in 1991

4th President of the Association of American Universities
- In office 1998–2006
- Preceded by: Cornelius J. Pings
- Succeeded by: Robert M. Berdahl

13th President of the University of Minnesota
- In office 1988–1997
- Preceded by: Kenneth H. Keller
- Succeeded by: Mark Yudof

Personal details
- Born: July 2, 1931 Värmland County, Sweden
- Died: January 23, 2019 (aged 87) Houston, Texas, U.S.
- Education: Uppsala University; Augustana College (BA); Harvard University (PhD)

Nils Hasselmo (July 2, 1931 – January 23, 2019) was the thirteenth president of the University of Minnesota, serving from 1988 to 1997. He went on to become the president of the Association of American Universities from 1998 to 2006.

== Background ==
Hasselmo was born in Köla parish in Värmland County, Sweden. He completed undergraduate and graduate degrees in Scandinavian languages and literature at Uppsala University, and did his military service in the Royal Signal Corps, including officer's training. As a scholarship student in the United States in 1956–57, he received a B.A. at Augustana College, Rock Island, Illinois. He finished a Ph.D. in linguistics from Harvard University in 1961.

== Biography ==
After teaching at Augustana and the University of Wisconsin–Madison, Hasselmo joined the faculty of the University of Minnesota in 1965. During the next 18 years at Minnesota, he served as chair of the Department of Scandinavian Languages and Literature and director of the Center for Northwest European Language and Area Studies, associate dean and executive officer of the College of Liberal Arts, and vice president for administration and planning. In 1983, he left Minnesota to serve for five and a half years as senior vice president for academic affairs and provost at the University of Arizona. He returned to the University of Minnesota as its 13th president in December 1988. After serving as president at the University of Minnesota, he moved to Washington D.C. to take the position of president of the Association of American Universities.

Hasselmo's scholarly work focused on the study of bilingualism and language contact, including books and articles on the Swedish language in America. He lectured in Sweden and Iceland in 1968–69, serving with visiting appointments at Scandinavian universities.

Hasselmo served as chair of the National Association of State Universities and Land-Grant Colleges, the Big Ten Council of Presidents, and the Minnesota Higher Education Advisory Council. He was president of the Society for the Advancement of Scandinavian Study and the Swedish-American Historical Society, and chairman of the Swedish Council of America, an umbrella organization with 300 affiliates. He served on the board of the National Merit Scholarship Corporation, the Universities' Research Association, the Carnegie Foundation for the Advancement of Teaching, the Council on Library and Information Resources, The American-Scandinavian Foundation, and a number of other scholarly, educational, civic, and cultural organizations.

Hasselmo received honors such as the Royal Order of the North Star by the King of Sweden, 1973; King Carl XVI Gustaf's Bicentennial Medal in Gold, 1976; and the Sandburg Medal, 1989; he was selected as Swedish-American of the Year by the Swedish government and the Vasa Order of America in 1991. He was elected to membership in several Swedish scholarly societies, and holds honorary doctorates from Uppsala University (1979), Augustana College, and North Park University.

Nils Hasselmo died on January 23, 2019, after a more than 20-year battle with prostate cancer. He is survived by his second wife, Ann Die Hasselmo, three children, a stepdaughter, nine grandchildren and a great-grandchild.

=== Nils Hasselmo Hall ===
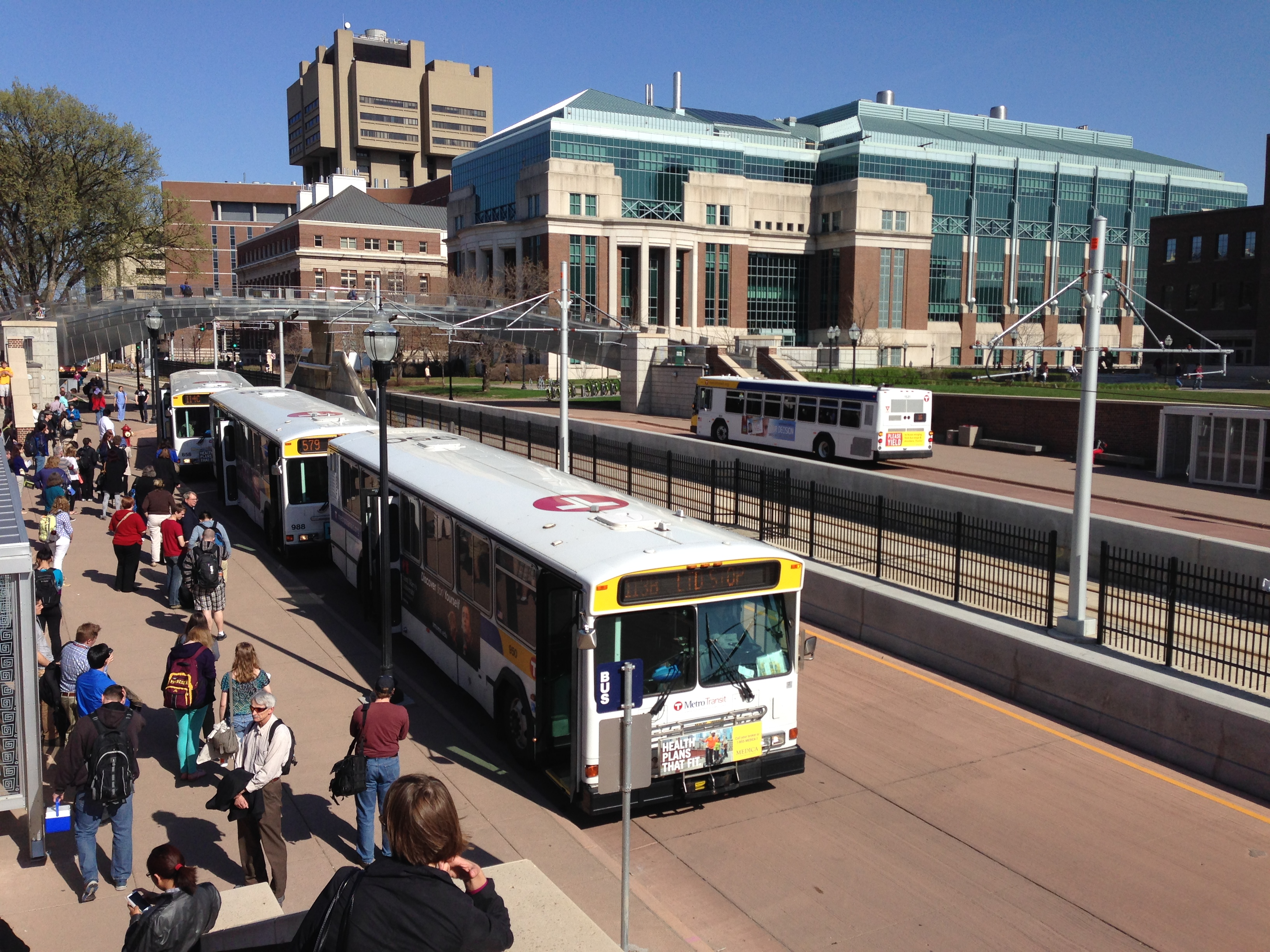
Glass-covered Hasselmo Hall and tall concrete Moos Health Science Tower in background.

Following his retirement as President of the University of Minnesota, the Basic Sciences and Biomedical Engineering Building was renamed the Nils Hasselmo Hall.

=== Nils Hasselmo Papers ===
The papers of Nils and Patricia Hasselmo, covering the period 1960s–1997, are located in University of Minnesota Archives.

== See also ==
- List of presidents of the University of Minnesota

Academic offices
Preceded by Kenneth H. Keller	13th President of the University of Minnesota; 1988 — 1997	Succeeded by Mark Yudof
