= Swedish–American Historical Society =

Swedish–American Historical Society logo

The Swedish–American Historical Society was founded in 1949 to record "the achievements of the Swedish pioneers" in North America. Its current mission is to "record and interpret the Swedish Presence in America." It has published numerous books since then and also publishes a scholarly journal titled the Swedish–American Historical Quarterly, formerly the Swedish Pioneer Historical Quarterly. In 2024, the Society transitioned to an annual journal called Swedish-American Studies that is published by the University of Minnesota Press.

== See also ==
- Swedish Americans
