= 2020 United States House of Representatives elections in Minnesota =

- November 3, 2020

All 8 Minnesota seats to the United States House of Representatives
| | Majority party | Minority party |
|---|---|---|
| Party | Democratic (DFL) | Republican |
| Last election | 5 | 3 |
| Seats won | 4 | 4 |
| Seat change | ▼1 | ▲1 |
| Popular vote | 1,554,373 | 1,474,820 |
| Percentage | 48.67% | 46.18% |
| Swing | ▼6.46% | ▲2.5% |

Democratic hold
Republican hold Republican gain
Democratic
40–50%
50–60%
60–70%
Republican
40–50%
50–60%
60–70%
70–80%

The 2020 United States House of Representatives elections in Minnesota were held on November 3, 2020, to elect the eight U.S. representatives from the state of Minnesota, one from each of its congressional districts. Primary elections were held in six districts on August 11. The elections coincided with the 2020 United States presidential election, as well as other elections to the House of Representatives, elections to the United States Senate and other state and local elections.

Due to changing political alignments, the Republican Party flipped the 7th district, which was held by 15-term incumbent Democrat Collin Peterson. This marked the first time since the 1944 election that Republicans won every district in Minnesota outside the Twin Cities metropolitan area, after Democrats had done the same just four years prior. This subsequently erased the slim Democratic majority in the state congressional delegation and gave both political parties a tied 4–4 delegation.

== Overview ==
=== Statewide ===
| Party | Candidates | Votes | | Seats | | |
| Party | Candidates | No. | % | No. | +/– | % |
|---|---|---|---|---|---|---|
| Democratic-Farmer-Labor | 8 | 1,554,373 | 48.67 | 4 | ▼1 | 50.00 |
| Republican | 8 | 1,474,820 | 46.18 | 4 | ▲1 | 50.00 |
| Legal Marijuana Now | 3 | 80,440 | 2.52 | 0 | Steady | 0.0 |
| Grassroots—LC | 4 | 79,674 | 2.49 | 0 | Steady | 0.0 |
| Write-in | 8 | 4,502 | 0.14 | 0 | Steady | 0.0 |
| Total | 26 | 3,193,809 | 100.0 | 8 | Steady | 100.0 |

Popular vote
| Democratic | 48.67% |
| Republican | 46.18% |
| Legal Marijuana | 2.52% |
| Grassroots–LC | 2.49% |
| Other | 0.14% |

House seats
| Democratic | 50.00% |
| Republican | 50.00% |

=== By district ===
Results of the 2020 United States House of Representatives elections in Minnesota by district:

| District | Democratic | | Republican | | Others | | Total | | Result |
| District | Votes | % | Votes | % | Votes | % | Votes | % | Result |
|---|---|---|---|---|---|---|---|---|---|
| District 1 | 167,890 | 45.52% | 179,234 | 48.59% | 21,732 | 5.89% | 368,856 | 100.0% | Republican hold |
| District 2 | 204,534 | 48.18% | 194,954 | 45.92% | 25,024 | 5.89% | 424,512 | 100.0% | Democratic hold |
| District 3 | 246,666 | 55.60% | 196,625 | 44.32% | 312 | 0.07% | 443,603 | 100.0% | Democratic hold |
| District 4 | 245,813 | 63.17% | 112,730 | 28.97% | 30,571 | 7.86% | 389,114 | 100.0% | Democratic hold |
| District 5 | 255,924 | 64.27% | 102,878 | 25.83% | 39,427 | 9.90% | 398,229 | 100.0% | Democratic hold |
| District 6 | 140,853 | 34.16% | 270,901 | 65.70% | 553 | 0.13% | 412,307 | 100.0% | Republican hold |
| District 7 | 144,840 | 39.85% | 194,066 | 53.39% | 24,571 | 6.76% | 363,477 | 100.0% | Republican gain |
| District 8 | 147,853 | 37.55% | 223,432 | 56.75% | 22,426 | 5.70% | 393,711 | 100.0% | Republican hold |
| Total | 1,554,373 | 48.67% | 1,474,820 | 46.18% | 164,616 | 5.15% | 3,193,809 | 100.0% | |

== District 1 ==
2020 Minnesota's 1st congressional district election
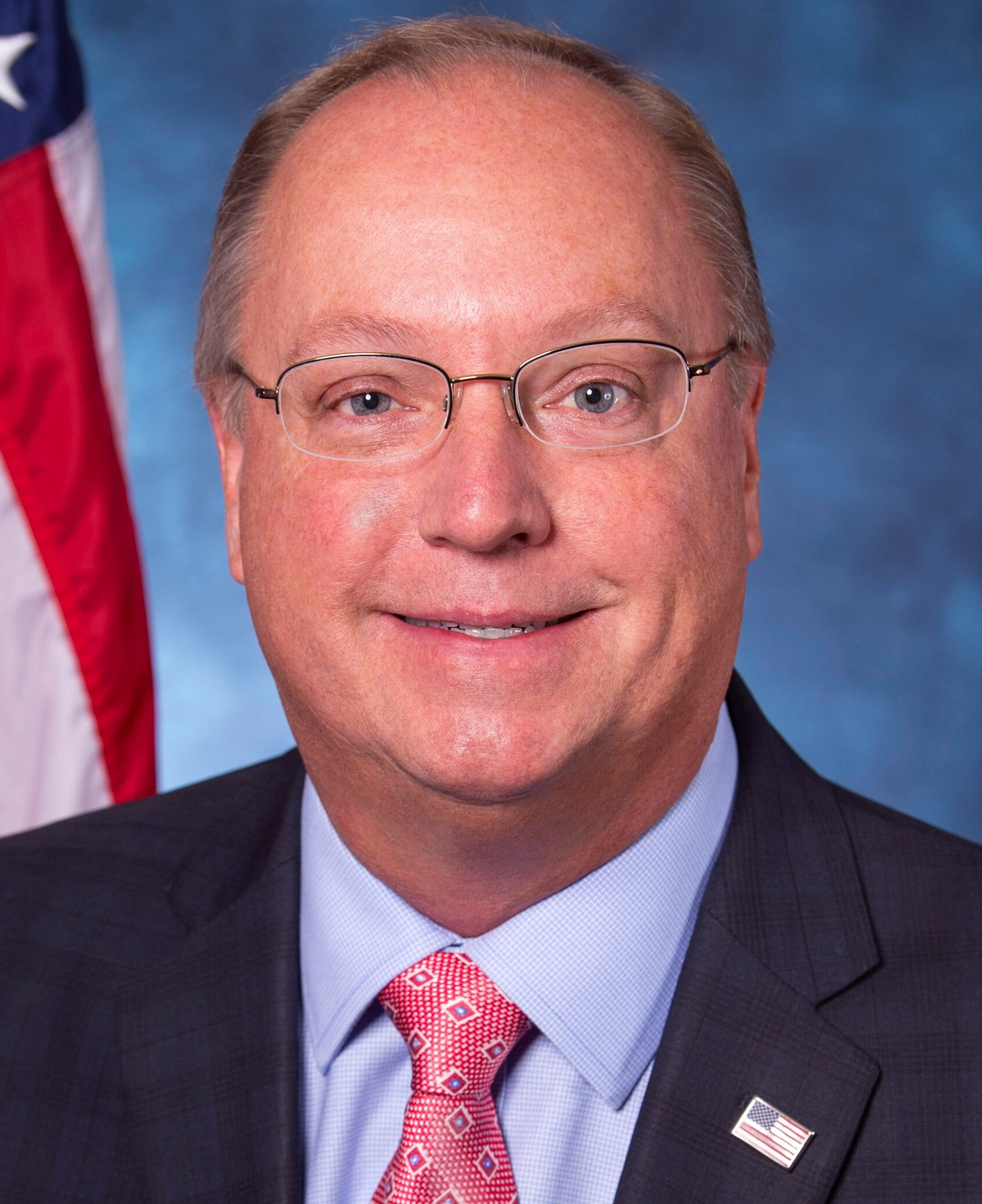

| Nominee | Jim Hagedorn | Dan Feehan | Bill Rood |
| Party | Republican | Democratic (DFL) | Grassroots—LC |
| Popular vote | 179,234 | 167,890 | 21,448 |
| Percentage | 48.6% | 45.5% | 5.8% |
- Hagedorn: 40–50% 50–60% 60–70% 70–80% 80–90% >90% Feehan: 40–50% 50–60% 60–70% 70–80% 80–90% Tie: 40–50% 50% No votes
U.S. Representative before election
Jim Hagedorn
Republican
Elected U.S. Representative
Jim Hagedorn
Republican

The 1st district stretches across southern Minnesota from its borders with South Dakota to Wisconsin, and includes the cities of Rochester, Mankato, Winona, Austin, Owatonna, Albert Lea, New Ulm, and Worthington. The incumbent was Republican Jim Hagedorn, who flipped the district and was elected with 50.1% of the vote in 2018.

=== Republican primary ===
==== Candidates ====
===== Nominee =====
- Jim Hagedorn, incumbent U.S. representative

=== Democratic primary ===
==== Candidates ====
===== Nominee =====
- Dan Feehan, U.S. Army veteran, former U.S. Department of Defense official, and nominee for Minnesota's 1st congressional district in 2018

===== Withdrawn =====
- Ralph Kaehler, farmer

=== Grassroots–Legalize Cannabis ===
==== Candidates ====
===== Nominee =====
- Bill Rood

=== General election ===
==== Endorsements ====
Dan Feehan (DFL)

U.S. presidents

- Barack Obama, 44th president of the United States (2009–2017), U.S. senator from Illinois (2005–2008)

U.S. representatives

- Gil Cisneros, U.S. representative (CA-39)
- Jason Crow, U.S. representative (CO-06)
- Chrissy Houlahan, U.S. representative (PA-06)
- Elaine Luria, U.S. representative (VA-02)
- Seth Moulton, U.S. representative (MA-06)
- Collin Peterson, U.S. representative (MN-07)
- Max Rose, U.S. representative (NY-11)
- Mikie Sherrill, U.S. representative (NJ-11)
- Elissa Slotkin, U.S. representative (MI-08)
- Abigail Spanberger, U.S. representative (VA-07)

Labor unions

- American Federation of Government Employees
- Education Minnesota
- International Association of Bridge, Structural, Ornamental and Reinforcing Iron Workers Local 512
- International Association of Machinists and Aerospace Workers Local 77
- International Brotherhood of Electrical Workers Local 343
- International Brotherhood of Teamsters Local 320
- Minnesota AFL–CIO
- Minnesota Professional Fire Fighters
- Operative Plasterers' and Cement Masons' International Association Local 633
- SMART Local 10
- United Association Local 6
- United Steelworkers Local 11

Organizations

- End Citizens United
- Everytown for Gun Safety
- Human Rights Campaign
- League of Conservation Voters
- NARAL
- New Democrat Coalition
- Planned Parenthood Action Fund
- Sierra Club

==== Polling ====
| Poll source | Date(s) administered | Sample size (Note: Key: A – all adults RV – registered voters LV – likely voters V – unclear) | Margin of error | Jim Hagedorn (R) | Dan Feehan (DFL) | Other/ Undecided |
|---|---|---|---|---|---|---|
| Public Policy Polling (D) (Note: Poll sponsored by End Citizens United, which endorsed Feehan prior to this poll's sampling period.) | September 10–11, 2020 | 885 (V) | ± 3.3% | 41% | 41% | 18% (Note: Undecided with 18%) |
| RMG Research | July 31 – August 7, 2020 | 500 (RV) | ± 4.5% | 41% | 38% | 22% (Note: Undecided with 22%) |
| Victoria Research & Consulting (D) (Note: Archived August 2, 2020, at the Wayback Machine) (Note: Poll sponsored by House Majority PAC.) | July 19–23, 2020 | 511 (LV) | ± 4.4% | 46% | 48% | 6% (Note: "Other/Neither" with 1%, Undecided with 5%) |
| Garin-Hart-Yang Research Group (D) (Note: Poll sponsored by Feehan's campaign) | June 9–13, 2020 | 601 (LV) | ± 4.1% | 2% | 43% | 15% |
| Harper Polling (R) (Note: Poll sponsored by Hagedorn's campaign) | March 10–12, 2020 | 406 (LV) | ± 4.9% | 49% | 33% | 18% |

Hypothetical polling

with Generic Republican and Generic Democrat

| Poll source | Date(s) administered | Sample size | Margin of error | Generic Republican | Generic Democrat | Other/ Undecided |
|---|---|---|---|---|---|---|
| Victoria Research & Consulting (D) (Note: Archived August 2, 2020, at the Wayback Machine) | July 19–23, 2020 | 511 (LV) | ± 4.4% | 44% | 49% | 8% (Note: "Other/Neither" with 2%, "Not sure/Refused" with 6%) |

==== Predictions ====
| Source | Ranking | As of |
|---|---|---|
| The Cook Political Report | Tossup | October 21, 2020 |
| Inside Elections | Tilt D (flip) | October 29, 2020 |
| Sabato's Crystal Ball | Lean D (flip) | November 2, 2020 |
| Politico | Tossup | October 11, 2020 |
| Daily Kos | Lean R | July 21, 2020 |
| RCP | Lean R | June 9, 2020 |
| Niskanen | Lean R | July 26, 2020 |

==== Results ====
2020 Minnesota's 1st congressional district election
| Party | Candidate | Votes | % |
|---|---|---|---|
| Republican | Jim Hagedorn (incumbent) | 179,234 | 48.6 |
| Democratic (DFL) | Dan Feehan | 167,890 | 45.5 |
| Grassroots—LC | Bill Rood | 21,448 | 5.8 |
| Write-in | | 284 | 0.1 |
| Total votes | | 368,856 | 100.0 |
| Republican hold | | | |

== District 2 ==
2020 Minnesota's 2nd congressional district election
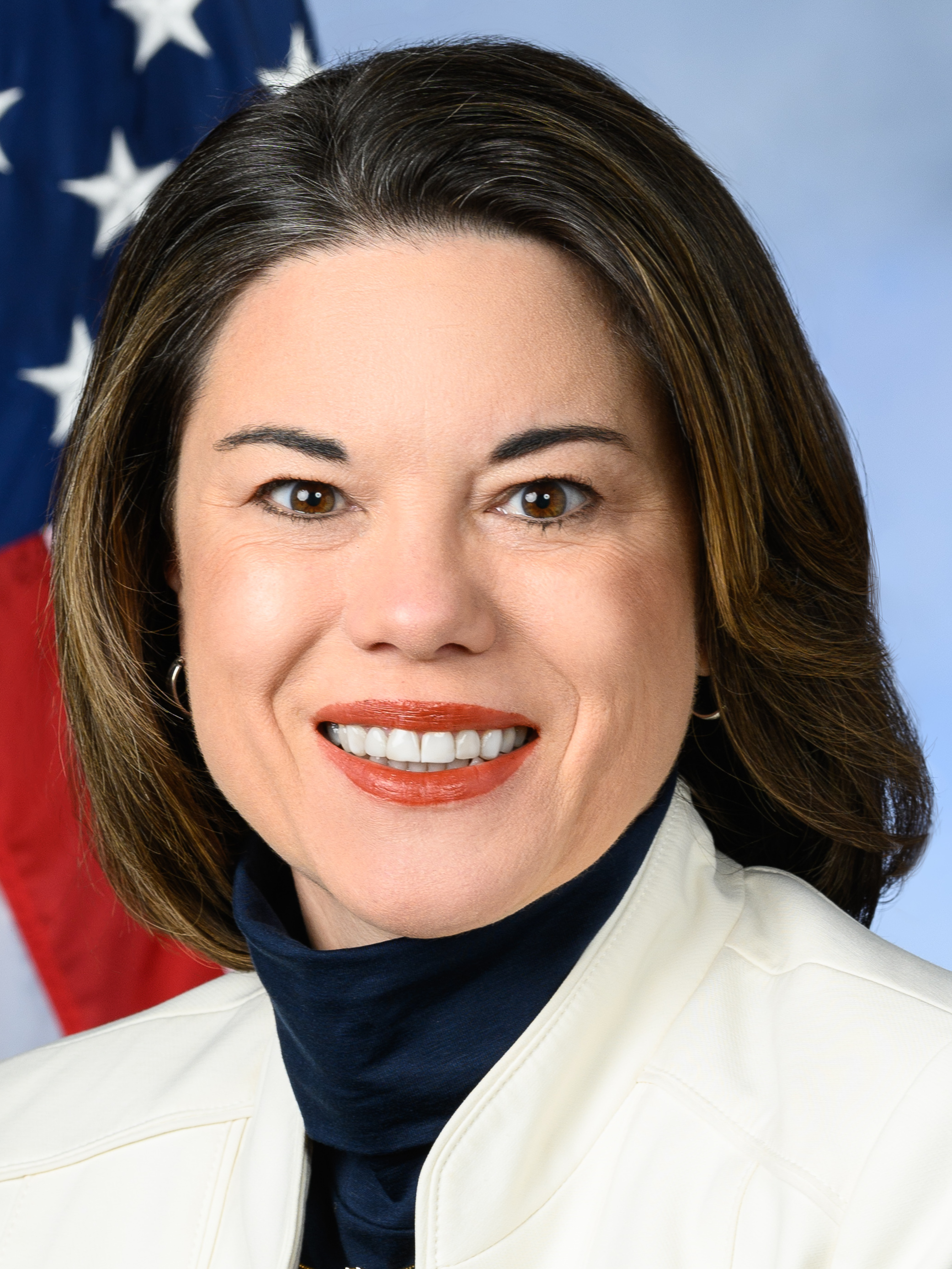

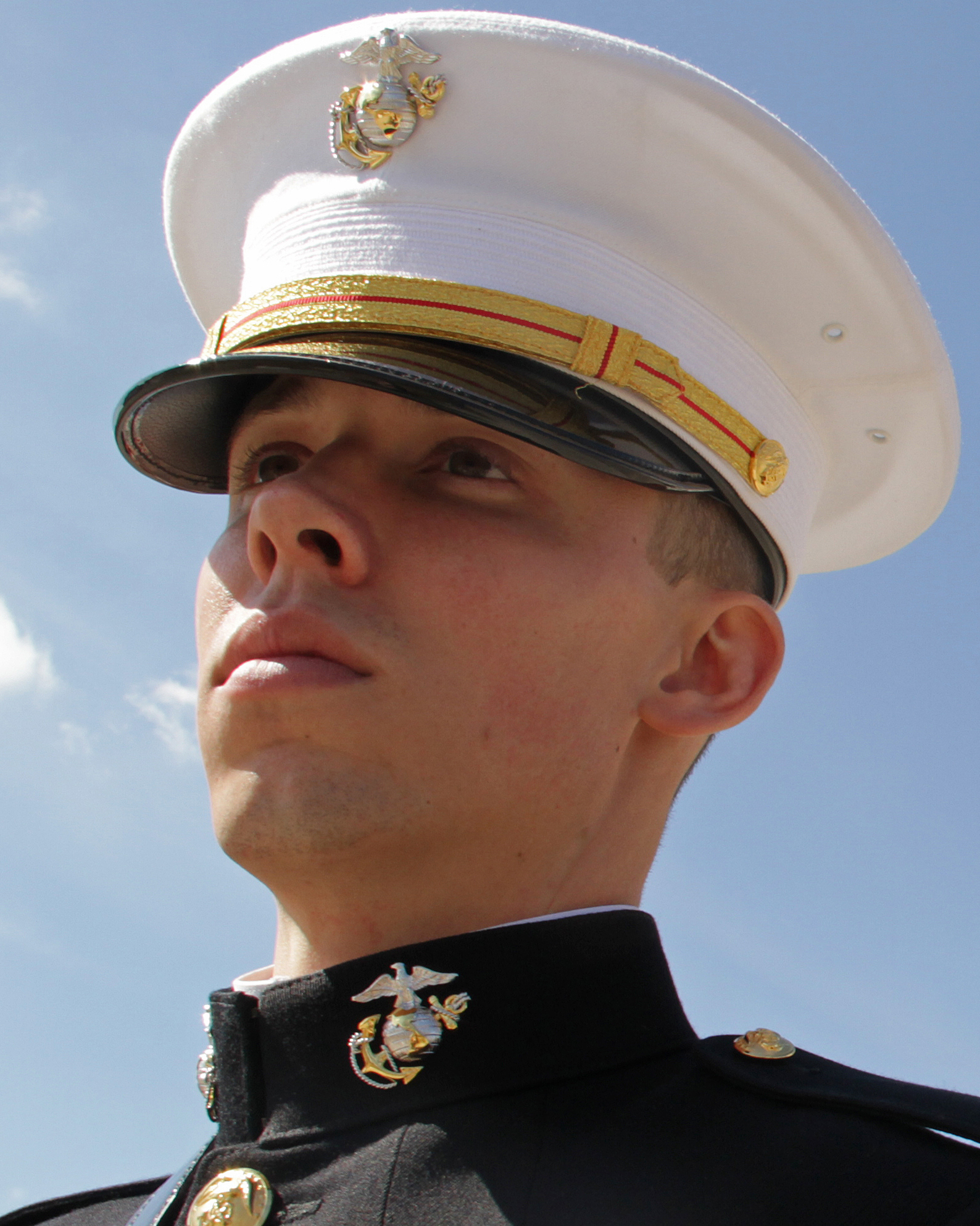

| Nominee | Angie Craig | Tyler Kistner | Adam Weeks † |
| Party | Democratic (DFL) | Republican | Legal Marijuana Now |
| Popular vote | 204,534 | 194,954 | 24,751 |
| Percentage | 48.2% | 45.9% | 5.8% |
- County results Craig: 40–50% 50–60% 60–70% Kistner: 50–60%

- Precinct results Craig: 40–50% 50–60% 60–70% 70–80% 80–90% Kistner: 40–50% 50–60% 60–70% 70–80%
U.S. Representative before election
Angie Craig
Democratic (DFL)
Elected U.S. Representative
Angie Craig
Democratic (DFL)

The 2nd district is based in the south Twin Cities area. The incumbent was Democrat Angie Craig, who defeated incumbent Republican Jason Lewis with 52.7% of the vote in 2018.

=== Democratic primary ===
==== Candidates ====
===== Nominee =====
- Angie Craig, incumbent U.S. representative

=== Republican primary ===
==== Candidates ====
===== Nominee =====
- Tyler Kistner, former Marine

===== Withdrawn =====
- Regina Barr, former state representative
- Erika Cashin, U.S. Air Force veteran
- Edward Moritz
- Rick Olson, former Michigan state representative
- Phillip Parrish, U.S. Naval intelligence officer
- Kerry Zeiler

===== Declined =====
- John Howe, former state senator and nominee for Minnesota Secretary of State in 2018
- Jason Lewis, former U.S. representative (running for U.S. Senate)
- Eric Pratt, state senator (running for re-election to the MN Senate)
- Doug Wardlow, former state representative and nominee for Minnesota Attorney General in 2018

===== Endorsements =====
Regina Barr

Organizations

- Maggie's List

=== Campaign ===
After Legal Marijuana Now Party candidate Adam Charles Weeks died on September 21, 2020, Minnesota Secretary of State Steve Simon announced that the votes in the November election would not be counted and that a special election would take place on February 9, 2021, due to an obscure state law which said that if a major-party candidate died within 79 days of an election, the election must be postponed. Craig challenged the law in court, arguing that Minnesota did not have the authority to delay a federal election; the judge agreed, ordering that the election be held on November 3 as originally planned. Although Republicans appealed the decision, it stood after the United States Supreme Court refused to hear the appeal.

A month after Weeks's death, and a week before the November 3 election, a friend of Weeks publicized a voicemail recording in which Weeks says that Republican donors offered him $15,000 to mount a campaign in order to siphon votes away from Craig. Jeff Schuette, Minnesota Republican Party chair for the Second District, denied involvement in the offer to fund Weeks's campaign.

==== Endorsements ====
Angie Craig (DFL)

U.S. presidents

- Barack Obama, 44th president of the United States (2009-2017), U.S. senator from Illinois (2005-2008)

State officials

- Tim Walz, incumbent governor

Organizations

- League of Conservation Voters Action Fund
- LGBTQ Victory Fund
- Sierra Club

==== Forum ====
2020 Minnesota's 2nd congressional district candidate forum
| No. | Date | Host | Moderator | Link | Democratic | Republican |
| Key: P Participant A Absent N Not invited I Invited W Withdrawn | | | | | | |
| Key: P Participant A Absent N Not invited I Invited W Withdrawn | | | | | Angie Craig | Tyler Kistner |
|---|---|---|---|---|---|---|
| 1 | Oct. 8, 2020 | Dakota County Regional Chamber of Commerce; Eagan Television | Maureen Scallon Failor | | P | P |

==== Polling ====
| Poll source | Date(s) administered | Sample size | Margin of error | Angie Craig (DFL) | Tyler Kistner (R) | Adam Weeks (LMN) | Undecided |
|---|---|---|---|---|---|---|---|
| Normington, Petts & Associates (D) (Note: Poll sponsored by Craig's campaign) | October 12–14, 2020 | 400 (LV) | ± 4.9% | 53% | 35% | 4% | – |
| Harper Polling (R) (Note: This poll was sponsored by Kistner's campaign.) | July 6–8, 2020 | 401 (LV) | – | 45% | 36% | 6% | – |

Hypothetical polling

Generic Democrat vs. generic Republican

| Poll source | Date(s) administered | Sample size | Margin of error | Generic Democrat | Generic Republican | Undecided |
|---|---|---|---|---|---|---|
| Harper Polling (R) | July 6–8, 2020 | 401 (LV) | – | 44% | 44% | – |

==== Predictions ====
| Source | Ranking | As of |
|---|---|---|
| The Cook Political Report | Likely D | October 21, 2020 |
| Inside Elections | Safe D | June 2, 2020 |
| Sabato's Crystal Ball | Likely D | July 2, 2020 |
| Politico | Lean D | April 19, 2020 |
| Daily Kos | Likely D | June 3, 2020 |
| RCP | Lean D | June 9, 2020 |
| Niskanen | Likely D | June 7, 2020 |

==== Results ====
2020 Minnesota's 2nd congressional district election
| Party | Candidate | Votes | % |
|---|---|---|---|
| Democratic (DFL) | Angie Craig (incumbent) | 204,534 | 48.2 |
| Republican | Tyler Kistner | 194,954 | 45.9 |
| Legal Marijuana Now | Adam Weeks † | 24,751 | 5.8 |
| Write-in | | 273 | 0.1 |
| Total votes | | 424,512 | 100.0 |
| Democratic (DFL) hold | | | |

== District 3 ==
2020 Minnesota's 3rd congressional district election
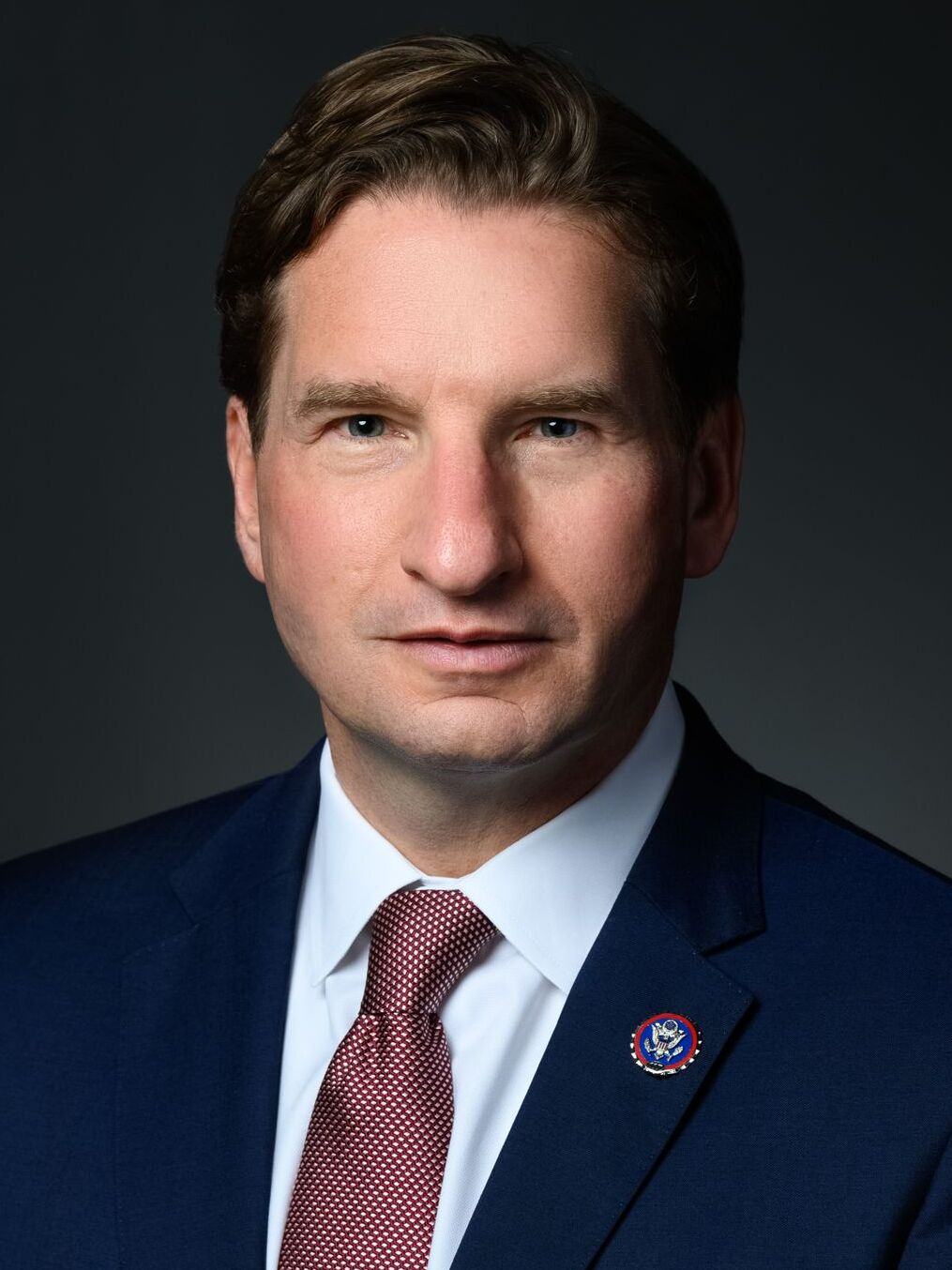

| Nominee | Dean Phillips | Kendall Qualls |
| Party | Democratic (DFL) | Republican |
| Popular vote | 246,666 | 196,625 |
| Percentage | 55.6% | 44.3% |
- County results Qualls: 50–60% Phillips: 50–60%

- Precinct results Phillips: 40–50% 50–60% 60–70% 70–80% Qualls: 50–60% 60–70% 70–80% Tie: 40–50% No votes
U.S. Representative before election
Dean Phillips
Democratic (DFL)
Elected U.S. Representative
Dean Phillips
Democratic (DFL)

The 3rd district encompasses the western suburbs of the Twin Cities, including Brooklyn Park, Coon Rapids to the northeast, Bloomington to the south, and Eden Prairie, Edina, Maple Grove, Plymouth, Minnetonka, and Wayzata to the west. The incumbent was Democrat Dean Phillips, who defeated incumbent Republican Erik Paulsen with 55.6% of the vote in 2018.

=== Democratic primary ===
==== Candidates ====
===== Nominee =====
- Dean Phillips, incumbent U.S. representative

===== Eliminated in primary =====
- Cole Young

==== Primary results ====
Democratic primary results
| Party | Candidate | Votes | % |
|---|---|---|---|
| Democratic (DFL) | Dean Phillips (incumbent) | 73,011 | 90.7 |
| Democratic (DFL) | Cole Young | 7,443 | 9.3 |
| Total votes | | 80,454 | 100.0 |

=== Republican primary ===
==== Candidates ====
===== Nominee =====
- Kendall Qualls, businessman

===== Eliminated in primary =====
- Leslie Davis

==== Primary results ====
Republican primary results
| Party | Candidate | Votes | % |
|---|---|---|---|
| Republican | Kendall Qualls | 25,405 | 75.9 |
| Republican | Leslie Davis | 8,060 | 24.1 |
| Total votes | | 33,465 | 100.0 |

=== General election ===
==== Predictions ====
| Source | Ranking | As of |
|---|---|---|
| The Cook Political Report | Safe D | July 17, 2020 |
| Inside Elections | Safe D | June 2, 2020 |
| Sabato's Crystal Ball | Safe D | July 2, 2020 |
| Politico | Likely D | April 19, 2020 |
| Daily Kos | Safe D | June 3, 2020 |
| RCP | Safe D | October 24, 2020 |
| Niskanen | Safe D | June 7, 2020 |

==== Results ====
2020 Minnesota's 3rd congressional district election
| Party | Candidate | Votes | % |
|---|---|---|---|
| Democratic (DFL) | Dean Phillips (incumbent) | 246,666 | 55.6 |
| Republican | Kendall Qualls | 196,625 | 44.3 |
| Write-in | | 312 | 0.1 |
| Total votes | | 443,603 | 100.0 |
| Democratic (DFL) hold | | | |

== District 4 ==
2020 Minnesota's 4th congressional district election
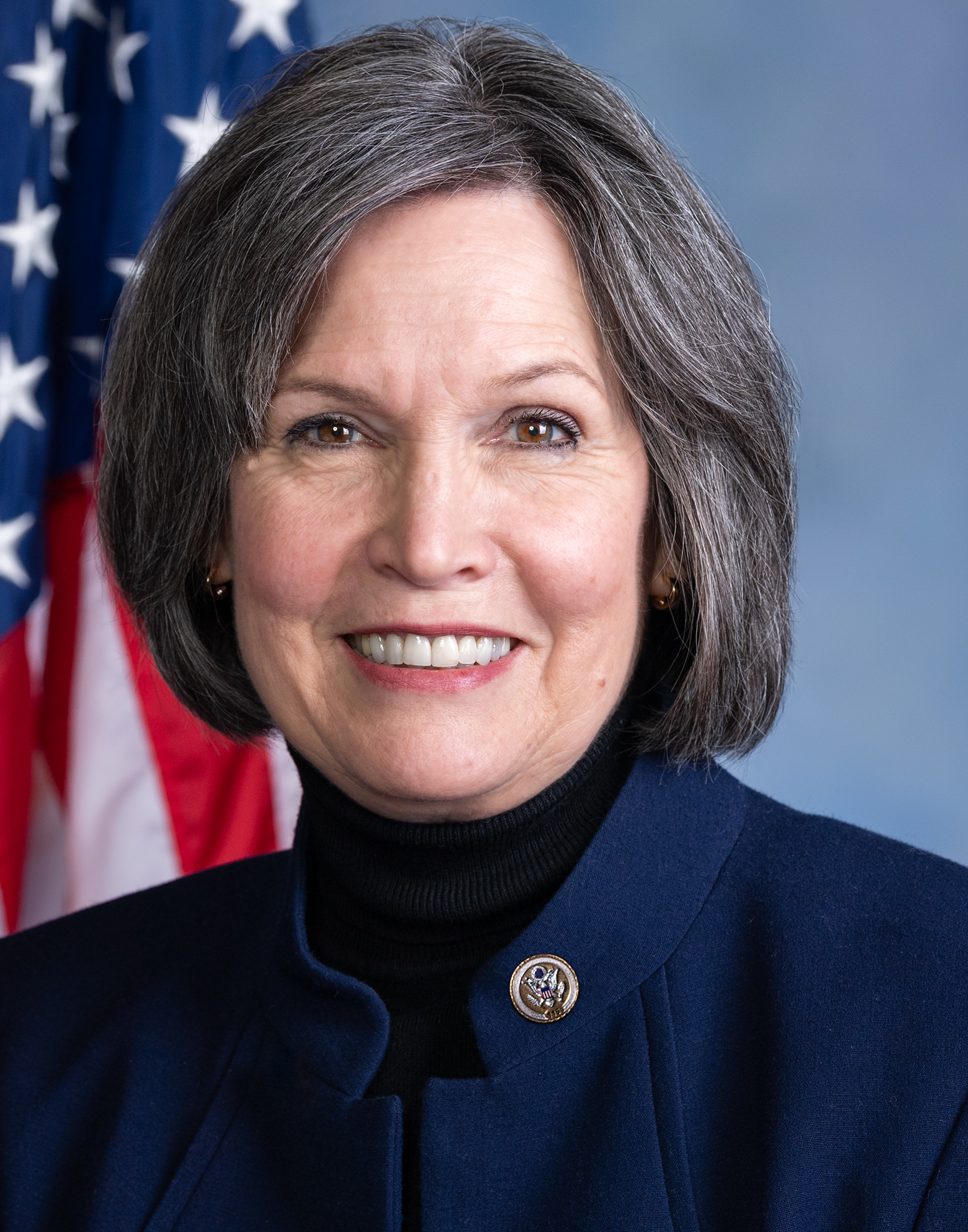

| Nominee | Betty McCollum | Gene Rechtzigel | Susan Sindt |
| Party | Democratic (DFL) | Republican | Grassroots—LC |
| Popular vote | 245,813 | 112,730 | 29,537 |
| Percentage | 63.2% | 29.0% | 7.6% |
- County results McCollum: 50–60% 60–70%

- Precinct results McCollum: 40–50% 50–60% 60–70% 70–80% 80–90% >90% Rechtzigel: 40–50% 50–60% No votes
U.S. Representative before election
Betty McCollum
Democratic (DFL)
Elected U.S. Representative
Betty McCollum
Democratic (DFL)

The 4th district encompasses the Saint Paul half of the Twin Cities metro area, including Ramsey County and parts of Washington County. The incumbent was Democrat Betty McCollum, who was reelected with 66.0% of the vote in 2018.

=== Democratic primary ===
==== Candidates ====
===== Nominee =====
- Betty McCollum, incumbent U.S. representative

===== Eliminated in primary =====
- Tiffini Flynn Forslund
- Alberder Gillespie
- Reid Rossell
- David Sandbeck, activist

==== Primary results ====
Democratic primary results
| Party | Candidate | Votes | % |
|---|---|---|---|
| Democratic (DFL) | Betty McCollum (incumbent) | 80,048 | 84.0 |
| Democratic (DFL) | Alberder Gillespie | 6,327 | 6.6 |
| Democratic (DFL) | Tiffini Flynd Forslund | 4,312 | 4.5 |
| Democratic (DFL) | David Sandbeck | 3,425 | 3.6 |
| Democratic (DFL) | Reid Rossell | 1,154 | 1.2 |
| Total votes | | 95,266 | 100.0 |

=== Republican primary ===
==== Candidates ====
===== Nominee =====
- Gene Rechtzigel, farmer

===== Eliminated in primary =====
- Sia Lo, former deputy city attorney

==== Primary results ====
Republican primary results
| Party | Candidate | Votes | % |
|---|---|---|---|
| Republican | Gene Rechtzigel | 9,182 | 50.9 |
| Republican | Sia Lo | 8,866 | 49.1 |
| Total votes | | 18,048 | 100.0 |

=== Grassroots–Legalize Cannabis primary ===
==== Candidates ====
===== Nominee =====
- Susan Sindt, LMN candidate for Minnesota's 4th congressional district in 2016 and 2018

==== Primary results ====
Grassroots–Legalize Cannabis primary results
| Party | Candidate | Votes | % |
|---|---|---|---|
| Grassroots—LC | Susan Sindt | 618 | 100.0 |
| Total votes | | 618 | 100.0 |

=== General election ===
==== Predictions ====
| Source | Ranking | As of |
|---|---|---|
| The Cook Political Report | Safe D | July 2, 2020 |
| Inside Elections | Safe D | June 2, 2020 |
| Sabato's Crystal Ball | Safe D | July 2, 2020 |
| Politico | Safe D | April 19, 2020 |
| Daily Kos | Safe D | June 3, 2020 |
| RCP | Safe D | June 9, 2020 |
| Niskanen | Safe D | June 7, 2020 |

==== Results ====
2020 Minnesota's 4th congressional district election
| Party | Candidate | Votes | % |
|---|---|---|---|
| Democratic (DFL) | Betty McCollum (incumbent) | 245,813 | 63.2 |
| Republican | Gene Rechtzigel | 112,730 | 29.0 |
| Grassroots—LC | Susan Sindt | 29,537 | 7.6 |
| Write-in | | 1,034 | 0.3 |
| Total votes | | 389,114 | 100.0 |
| Democratic (DFL) hold | | | |

== District 5 ==
2020 Minnesota's 5th congressional district election
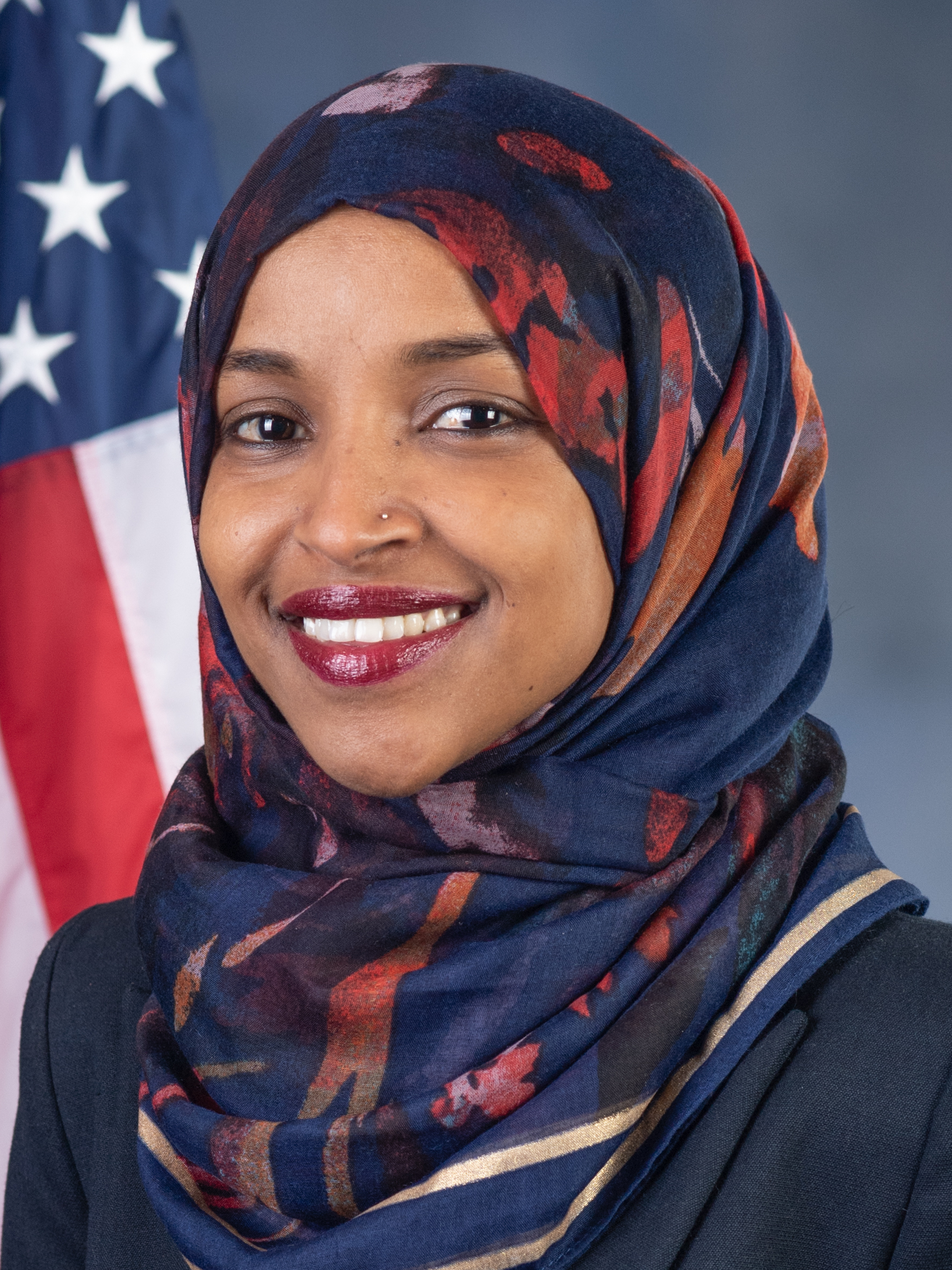

| Nominee | Ilhan Omar | Lacy Johnson | Michael Moore |
| Party | Democratic (DFL) | Republican | Legal Marijuana Now |
| Popular vote | 255,924 | 102,878 | 37,979 |
| Percentage | 64.3% | 25.8% | 9.5% |
- County results Omar: 40–50% 60–70%

- Precinct results Omar: 40–50% 50–60% 60–70% 70–80% 80–90% Johnson: 40–50% 50–60% No votes
U.S. Representative before election
Ilhan Omar
Democratic (DFL)
Elected U.S. Representative
Ilhan Omar
Democratic (DFL)

The 5th district encompasses eastern Hennepin County, including all of Minneapolis and the cities of St. Louis Park, Richfield, Crystal, Robbinsdale, Golden Valley, New Hope, and Fridley. The incumbent was Democrat Ilhan Omar, who was elected with 78.0% of the vote in 2018.

=== Democratic primary ===
Omar defeated Melton-Meaux in the primary by a significant margin, a win which was seen as unsurprising, as the 5th has a reputation as being a strong base of progressivism.

==== Candidates ====
===== Nominee =====
- Ilhan Omar, incumbent U.S. representative

===== Eliminated in primary =====
- Les Lester, author and teacher
- John Mason, activist
- Daniel Patrick McCarthy
- Antone Melton-Meaux, attorney

==== Withdrawn ====
- Leila Shukri Adan (endorsed Melton-Meaux)
- Ervan Katari Miller
- Haji Yussuf (endorsed Omar)

===== Endorsements =====
Antone Melton-Meaux

Federal officials

- Andrew M. Luger, former U.S. Attorney for the District of Minnesota (2014–2017)

State officials

- Dick Cohen, state senator and former state representative (1977–1979, 1983–1987)
- Edwina Garcia, former state representative (1991–1998)
- Ron Latz, state senator and former state representative
- Jared Polis, governor of Colorado

Party officials

- Mike Erlandson, former chair of the Minnesota Democratic–Farmer–Labor Party (1999–2005)

Individuals

- Nekima Levy Armstrong, lawyer and former president of the Minneapolis NAACP
- Robert Bruininks, former University of Minnesota president
- Bill George, Harvard Business School professor and CEO of Medtronic
- Jonathan D. Gray, Blackstone Group COO and president and Hilton Worldwide chairman
- Josie R. Johnson, community organizer and activist
- Eric Kaler, chemical engineer and University of Minnesota professor and ex-president
- Seth Klarman, billionaire investor and hedge fund manager
- Marilyn Carlson Nelson, co-owner and former CEO of Carlson

Newspapers and media

- Star Tribune
Ilhan Omar

U.S. senators

- Bernie Sanders, U.S. senator from Vermont, 2016 and 2020 Democratic presidential candidate
- Tina Smith, U.S. senator from Minnesota and former lieutenant governor (2015–2018)
- Elizabeth Warren, U.S. senator from Massachusetts and 2020 Democratic presidential candidate

U.S. representatives

- Pramila Jayapal, U.S. representative from WA-7 and co-chair of the Congressional Progressive Caucus
- Barbara Lee, U.S. representative (CA-13)
- Alexandria Ocasio-Cortez, U.S. representative (NY-14)
- Nancy Pelosi, U.S. representative (CA-12) and House Speaker
- Mark Pocan, U.S. representative from WI-2 and Co-Chair of the Congressional Progressive Caucus
- Ayanna Pressley, U.S. representative (MA-07)
- Rashida Tlaib, U.S. representative (MI-13)

State officials

- Keith Ellison, attorney general and former U.S. representative from MN-5
- Peggy Flanagan, lieutenant governor
- Melissa Hortman, Speaker of the Minnesota House of Representatives and state representative
- Carolyn Laine, state senator and former state representative (2007–2017)
- Jamie Long, state representative
- Tim Walz, governor of Minnesota

Local officials

- Jeremiah Ellison, member of the Minneapolis City Council
- Andrea Jenkins, vice president of the Minneapolis City Council

Organizations

- 350 Action
- Congressional Black Caucus PAC
- Congressional Progressive Caucus PAC
- Council for a Livable World
- Democracy for America
- End Citizens United
- Equality PAC
- Jewish Voice for Peace Action
- Justice Democrats
- Minnesota Democratic–Farmer–Labor Party
- MoveOn
- National Iranian American Council (NIAC) Action
- National Organization for Women PAC
- National Women's Political Caucus
- OutFront Minnesota
- Peace Action
- People's Action
- Planned Parenthood Action Fund
- Progressive Change Campaign Committee
- Sierra Club
- TakeAction Minnesota
- Working Families Party

Labor unions

- AFL–CIO Minnesota
- AFT
- Education Minnesota
- International Brotherhood of Teamsters Local 120
- IUPAT
- National Education Association
- National Nurses United
- SEIU Minnesota State Council

===== Polling =====
| Poll source | Date(s) administered | Sample size | Margin of error | Ilhan Omar | Antone Melton-Meaux | Other/ Undecided |
|---|---|---|---|---|---|---|
| Change Research (Note: Poll conducted for Ilhan Omar) | July 7–9, 2020 | 509 (LV) | ± 4.3% | 66% | 29% | 5% (Note: "Other" with 3% and Undecided with 2%) |

===== Primary results =====
Democratic primary results
| Party | Candidate | Votes | % |
|---|---|---|---|
| Democratic (DFL) | Ilhan Omar (incumbent) | 103,535 | 58.2 |
| Democratic (DFL) | Antone Melton-Meaux | 68,524 | 38.5 |
| Democratic (DFL) | John Mason | 2,721 | 1.5 |
| Democratic (DFL) | Daniel Patrick McCarthy | 1,901 | 1.1 |
| Democratic (DFL) | Les Lester | 1,267 | 0.7 |
| Total votes | | 172,457 | 100.0 |

=== Republican primary ===
==== Candidates ====
===== Nominee =====
- Lacy Johnson, former IT consultant

===== Eliminated in primary =====
- Dalia al-Aqidi, journalist
- Danielle Stella, teacher

==== Endorsements ====
Lacy Johnson

U.S. presidents

- Donald Trump, President of the United States

==== Primary results ====
Republican primary results
| Party | Candidate | Votes | % |
|---|---|---|---|
| Republican | Lacy Johnson | 9,188 | 76.6 |
| Republican | Danielle Stella | 2,236 | 18.7 |
| Republican | Dalia al-Aqidi | 568 | 4.7 |
| Total votes | | 11,992 | 100.0 |

=== Legal Marijuana Now primary ===
==== Candidates ====
===== Nominee =====
- Michael Moore

==== Primary results ====
Legal Marijuana Now primary results
| Party | Candidate | Votes | % |
|---|---|---|---|
| Legal Marijuana Now | Michael Moore | 940 | 100.0 |
| Total votes | | 940 | 100.0 |

=== General election ===
==== Predictions ====
| Source | Ranking | As of |
|---|---|---|
| The Cook Political Report | Safe D | July 2, 2020 |
| Inside Elections | Safe D | June 2, 2020 |
| Sabato's Crystal Ball | Safe D | July 2, 2020 |
| Politico | Safe D | April 19, 2020 |
| Daily Kos | Safe D | June 3, 2020 |
| RCP | Safe D | June 9, 2020 |
| Niskanen | Safe D | June 7, 2020 |

==== Results ====
2020 Minnesota's 5th congressional district election
| Party | Candidate | Votes | % |
|---|---|---|---|
| Democratic (DFL) | Ilhan Omar (incumbent) | 255,924 | 64.3 |
| Republican | Lacy Johnson | 102,878 | 25.8 |
| Legal Marijuana Now | Michael Moore | 37,979 | 9.5 |
| Write-in | | 1,448 | 0.4 |
| Total votes | | 398,229 | 100.0 |
| Democratic (DFL) hold | | | |

== District 6 ==
2020 Minnesota's 6th congressional district election
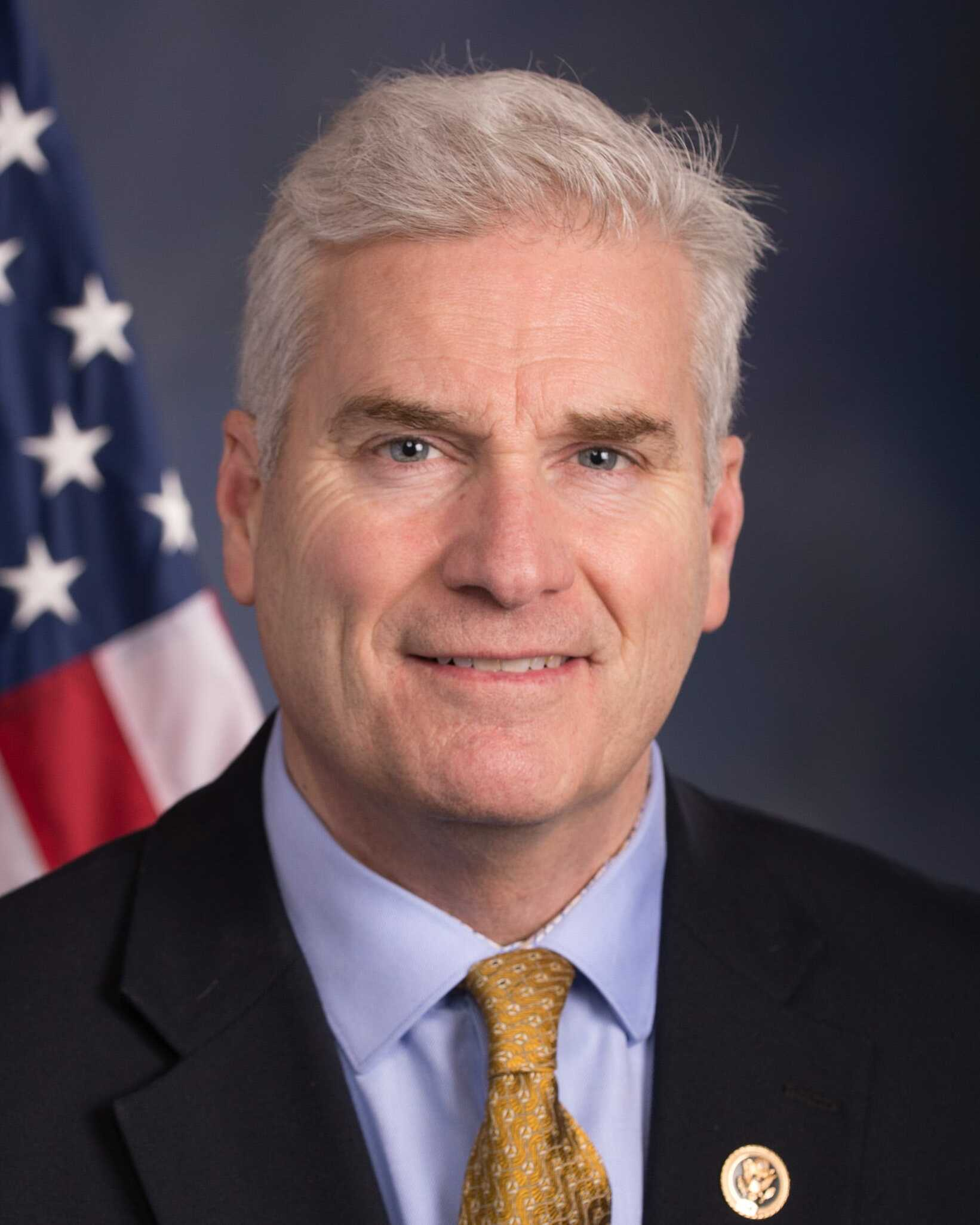

| Nominee | Tom Emmer | Tawnja Zahradka |
| Party | Republican | Democratic (DFL) |
| Popular vote | 270,901 | 140,853 |
| Percentage | 65.7% | 34.2% |
- County results Emmer: 60–70% 70–80%

- Precinct results Emmer: 50–60% 60–70% 70–80% 80–90% Zahradka: 50–60% 60–70% 70–80% No votes
U.S. Representative before election
Tom Emmer
Republican
Elected U.S. Representative
Tom Emmer
Republican

The 6th district encompasses the northern suburbs and exurbs of Minneapolis, including all of Benton, Sherburne, and Wright counties and parts of Anoka, Carver, Stearns, and Washington counties. The incumbent was Republican Tom Emmer, who was reelected with 61.1% of the vote in 2018.

=== Republican primary ===
==== Candidates ====
===== Nominee =====
- Tom Emmer, incumbent U.S. representative

===== Eliminated in primary =====
- Patrick Munro, candidate for Minnesota's 6th congressional district in 2016 and 2018

==== Primary results ====
Republican primary results
| Party | Candidate | Votes | % |
|---|---|---|---|
| Republican | Tom Emmer (incumbent) | 30,654 | 87.2 |
| Republican | Patrick Munro | 4,518 | 12.8 |
| Total votes | | 35,172 | 100.0 |

=== Democratic primary ===
==== Candidates ====
===== Nominee =====
- Tawnja Zahradka, broadcaster and former Ms. Minnesota-America

==== Primary results ====
Democratic primary results
| Party | Candidate | Votes | % |
|---|---|---|---|
| Democratic (DFL) | Tawnja Zahradka | 29,445 | 100.0 |
| Total votes | | 29,445 | 100.0 |

=== General election ===
==== Predictions ====
| Source | Ranking | As of |
|---|---|---|
| The Cook Political Report | Safe R | July 2, 2020 |
| Inside Elections | Safe R | June 2, 2020 |
| Sabato's Crystal Ball | Safe R | July 2, 2020 |
| Politico | Safe R | April 19, 2020 |
| Daily Kos | Safe R | June 3, 2020 |
| RCP | Safe R | June 9, 2020 |
| Niskanen | Safe R | June 7, 2020 |

==== Results ====
2020 Minnesota's 6th congressional district election
| Party | Candidate | Votes | % |
|---|---|---|---|
| Republican | Tom Emmer (incumbent) | 270,901 | 65.7 |
| Democratic (DFL) | Tawnja Zahradka | 140,853 | 34.2 |
| Write-in | | 553 | 0.1 |
| Total votes | | 412,307 | 100.0 |
| Republican hold | | | |

== District 7 ==
2020 Minnesota's 7th congressional district election
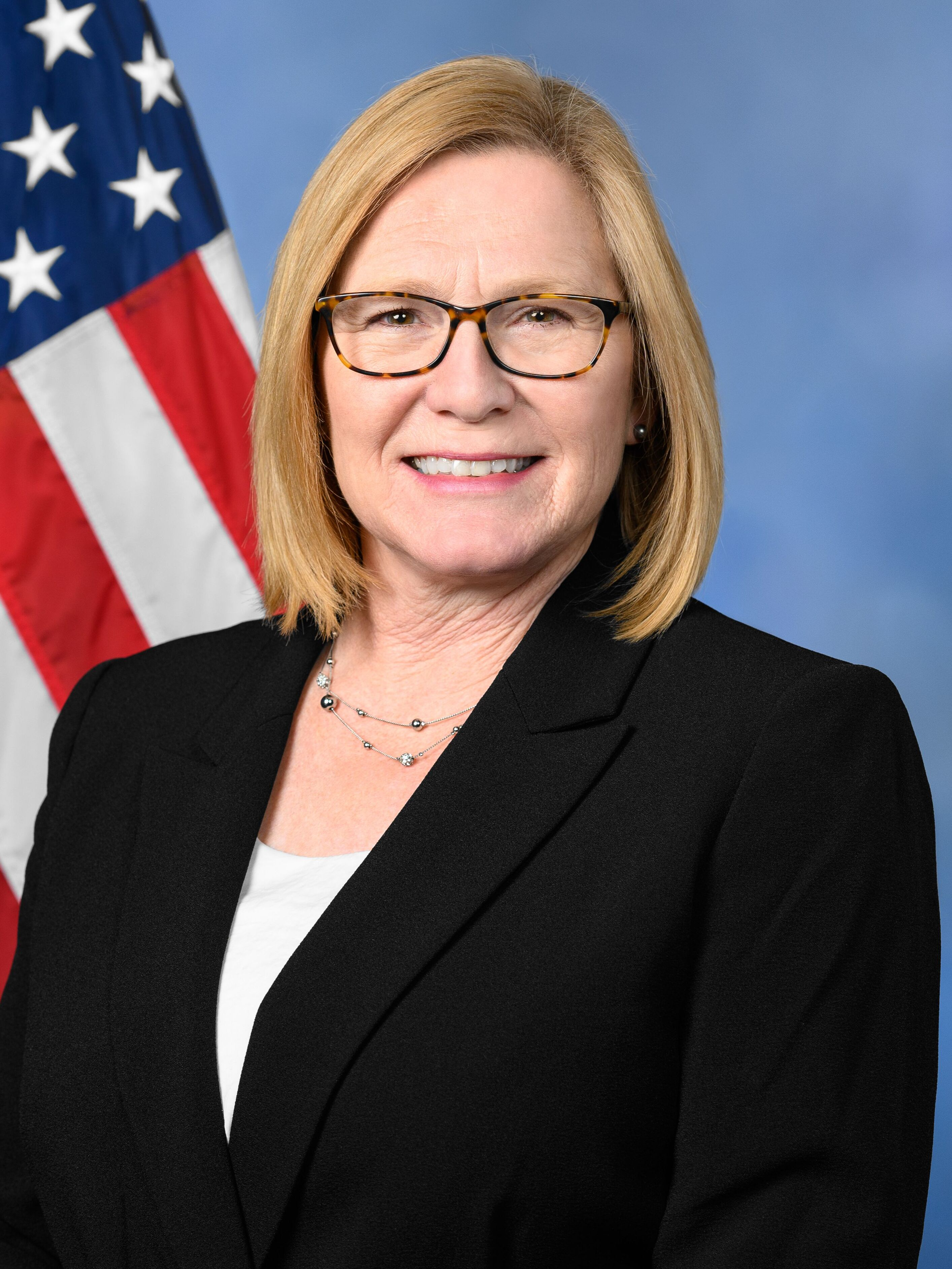

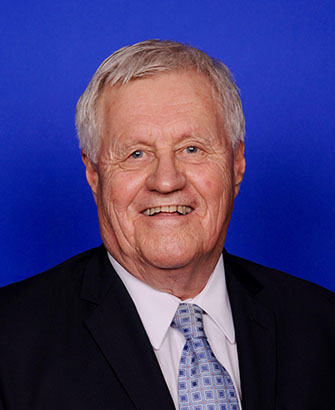
| Nominee | Michelle Fischbach | Collin Peterson |
| Party | Republican | Democratic (DFL) |
| Popular vote | 194,066 | 144,840 |
| Percentage | 53.4% | 39.8% |
- Fischbach: 40–50% 50–60% 60–70% 70–80% 80–90% >90% Peterson: 40–50% 50–60% 60–70% 70–80% 80–90% >90% Tie: 40–50% 50% No votes
U.S. Representative before election
Collin Peterson
Democratic (DFL)
Elected U.S. Representative
Michelle Fischbach
Republican

The 7th district covers all but the southern end of rural western Minnesota, and includes the cities of Moorhead, Willmar, Alexandria, and Fergus Falls. The incumbent was Democrat Collin Peterson, who was reelected with 52.1% of the vote in 2018.

=== Democratic primary ===
==== Candidates ====
===== Nominee =====
- Collin Peterson, incumbent U.S. representative

===== Eliminated in primary =====
- Stephen A. Emery, sales representative
- Alycia Gruenhagen

===== Endorsements =====
Collin Peterson

State officials

- Tim Walz, incumbent governor

Organizations

- Democrats for Life of America
- Education Minnesota
- Minnesota AFL–CIO

==== Primary results ====
Democratic primary results
| Party | Candidate | Votes | % |
|---|---|---|---|
| Democratic (DFL) | Collin Peterson (incumbent) | 26,925 | 75.6 |
| Democratic (DFL) | Alycia Gruenhagen | 5,956 | 16.7 |
| Democratic (DFL) | Stephen Emery | 2,734 | 7.7 |
| Total votes | | 35,615 | 100.0 |

=== Republican primary ===
==== Candidates ====
===== Nominee =====
- Michelle Fischbach, former lieutenant governor of Minnesota and former president of the Minnesota Senate

===== Eliminated in primary =====
- Noel Collis, gastroenterologist
- Dave Hughes, U.S. Air Force veteran and nominee for Minnesota's 7th congressional district in 2016 and 2018
- William Louwagie, farmer
- Jayesun Sherman, former teacher and former youth pastor

===== Withdrawn =====
- Joel Novak, U.S. Army veteran

===== Declined =====
- Jeff Backer, state representative
- Scott Van Binsbergen, businessman

===== Endorsements =====
Michelle Fischbach

U.S. presidents

- Donald Trump, 45th president of the United States

Organizations

- Maggie's List
- Susan B. Anthony List

==== Primary results ====
Republican primary results
| Party | Candidate | Votes | % |
|---|---|---|---|
| Republican | Michelle Fischbach | 26,359 | 58.8 |
| Republican | Dave Hughes | 9,948 | 22.2 |
| Republican | Noel Collis | 6,747 | 15.1 |
| Republican | William Louwagie | 989 | 2.2 |
| Republican | Jayesun Sherman | 757 | 1.7 |
| Total votes | | 44,800 | 100.0 |

=== Grassroots–Legalize Cannabis primary ===
==== Candidates ====
===== Nominee =====
- Rae Hart Anderson, Republican candidate for U.S. Senate in 2018

===== Eliminated in primary =====
- Kevin "NeNe" Shores

==== Primary results ====
Grassroots–Legalize Cannabis primary results
| Party | Candidate | Votes | % |
|---|---|---|---|
| Grassroots—LC | Rae Hart Anderson | 215 | 67.4 |
| Grassroots—LC | Kevin Shores | 104 | 32.6 |
| Total votes | | 319 | 100.0 |

=== Legalize Marijuana Now primary ===
==== Candidates ====
===== Nominee =====
- Slater Johnson

==== Primary results ====
Legal Marijuana Now primary results
| Party | Candidate | Votes | % |
|---|---|---|---|
| Legal Marijuana Now | Slater Johnson | 592 | 100.0 |
| Total votes | | 592 | 100.0 |

==== Debates ====
- Complete video of debate, October 5, 2020

=== General election ===
==== Polling ====
| Poll source | Date(s) administered | Sample size | Margin of error | Collin Peterson (DFL) | Michelle Fischbach (R) | Undecided |
|---|---|---|---|---|---|---|
| Tarrance Group (R) (Note: Poll conducted for the CLF) | August 2–5, 2020 | 413 (RV) | ± 4.9% | 42% | 52% | 6% |

==== Predictions ====
| Source | Ranking | As of |
|---|---|---|
| The Cook Political Report | Tossup | July 16, 2020 |
| Inside Elections | Tossup | October 16, 2020 |
| Sabato's Crystal Ball | Lean R (flip) | November 2, 2020 |
| Politico | Tossup | July 6, 2020 |
| Daily Kos | Lean R (flip) | November 2, 2020 |
| RCP | Tossup | June 9, 2020 |
| Niskanen | Lean D | July 26, 2020 |

==== Results ====
2020 Minnesota's 7th congressional district election
| Party | Candidate | Votes | % |
|---|---|---|---|
| Republican | Michelle Fischbach | 194,066 | 53.4 |
| Democratic (DFL) | Collin Peterson (incumbent) | 144,840 | 39.8 |
| Legal Marijuana Now | Slater Johnson | 17,710 | 4.9 |
| Grassroots—LC | Rae Hart Anderson | 6,499 | 1.8 |
| Write-in | | 362 | 0.1 |
| Total votes | | 363,477 | 100.0 |
| Republican gain from Democratic (DFL) | | | |

== District 8 ==
2020 Minnesota's 8th congressional district election
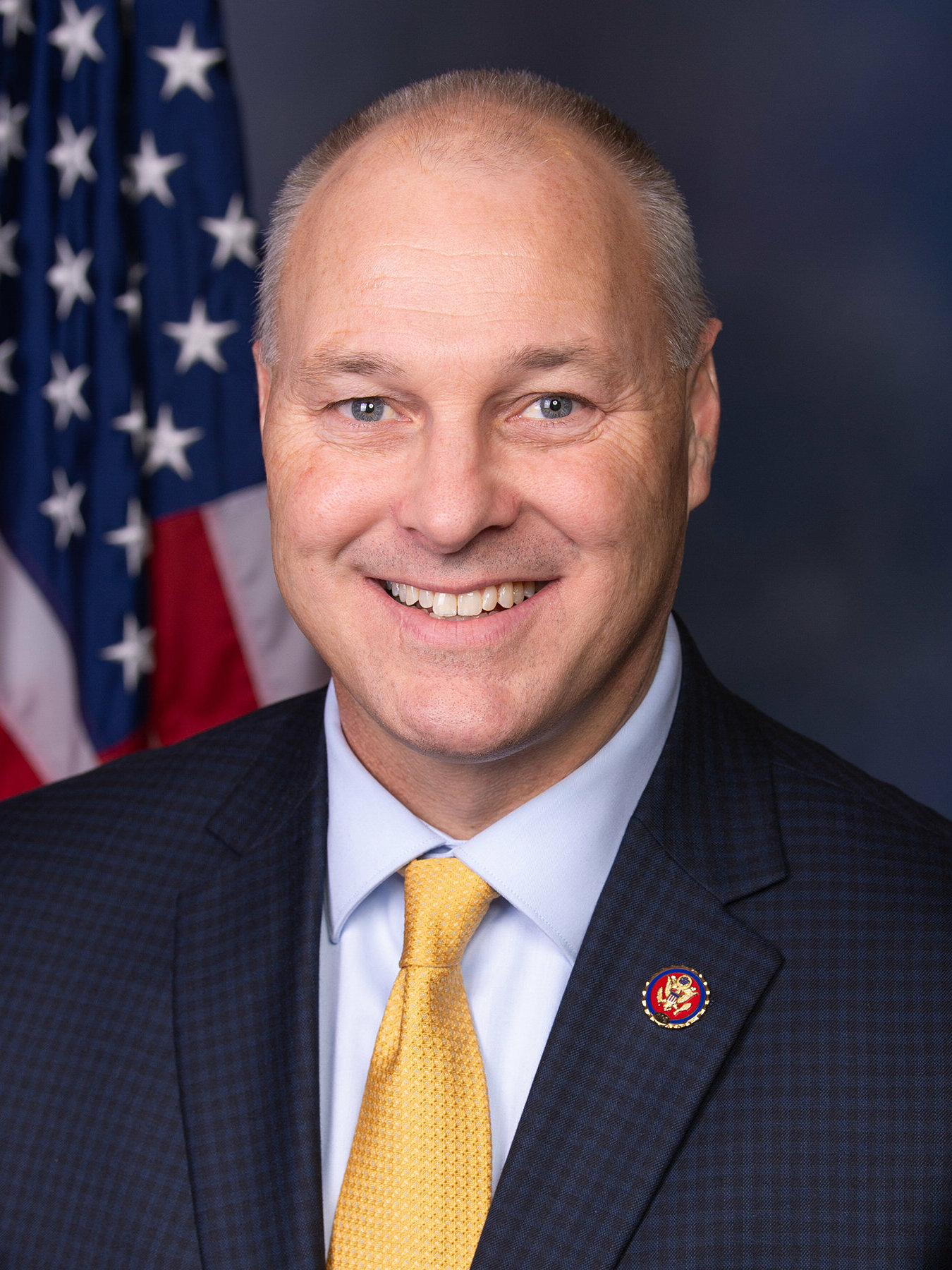

| Nominee | Pete Stauber | Quinn Nystrom | Judith Schwartzbacker |
| Party | Republican | Democratic (DFL) | Grassroots—LC |
| Popular vote | 223,432 | 147,853 | 22,190 |
| Percentage | 56.7% | 37.6% | 5.6% |
- Stauber: 40–50% 50–60% 60–70% 70–80% 80–90% >90% Nystrom: 40–50% 50–60% 60–70% 70–80% >90% Tie: 40–50% 50% No votes
U.S. Representative before election
Pete Stauber
Republican
Elected U.S. Representative
Pete Stauber
Republican

The 8th district is based in the Iron Range and home to the city of Duluth. The incumbent was Republican Pete Stauber, who flipped the district and was elected with 50.7% of the vote in 2018.

=== Republican primary ===
==== Candidates ====
===== Nominee =====
- Pete Stauber, incumbent U.S. representative

===== Eliminated in primary =====
- Harry Welty, former teacher

==== Primary results ====
Republican primary results
| Party | Candidate | Votes | % |
|---|---|---|---|
| Republican | Pete Stauber (incumbent) | 39,060 | 93.7 |
| Republican | Harry Welty | 2,606 | 6.3 |
| Total votes | | 41,666 | 100.0 |

=== Democratic primary ===
==== Candidates ====
===== Nominee =====
- Quinn Nystrom, diabetes issues advocate and former Baxter city councilwoman

===== Withdrawn =====
- Marje Holmstrom-Sabo, software engineer
- Soren Sorensen, activist and candidate for Minnesota's 8th congressional district in 2018
- Gaylene Spolarich, former Palisade city clerk

===== Declined =====
- Michelle Lee, former news anchor and candidate for Minnesota's 8th congressional district in 2018
- Leah Phifer, former federal counterterrorism analyst and candidate for Minnesota's 8th congressional district in 2018
- Joe Radinovich, former state representative and nominee for Minnesota's 8th congressional district in 2018
- Roger Reinert, former state senator and former state representative

===== Endorsements =====
Quinn Nystrom

Federal politicians

- Rick Nolan, former U.S. representative of Minnesota's 8th congressional district (2013- 2019), Minnesota's 6th congressional district (1975-1981)

Organizations

- Sierra Club

==== Primary results ====
Democratic primary results
| Party | Candidate | Votes | % |
|---|---|---|---|
| Democratic (DFL) | Quinn Nystrom | 46,050 | 100.0 |
| Total votes | | 46,050 | 100.0 |

=== Grassroots–Legalize Cannabis primary ===
==== Candidates ====
===== Nominee =====
- Judith Schwartzbacker, Grassroots nominee for lieutenant governor of Minnesota in 2018

==== Primary results ====
Grassroots–Legalize Cannabis primary results
| Party | Candidate | Votes | % |
|---|---|---|---|
| Grassroots—LC | Judith Schwartzbacker | 540 | 100.0 |
| Total votes | | 540 | 100.0 |

=== General election ===
==== Predictions ====
| Source | Ranking | As of |
|---|---|---|
| The Cook Political Report | Safe R | August 14, 2020 |
| Inside Elections | Safe R | June 2, 2020 |
| Sabato's Crystal Ball | Safe R | July 2, 2020 |
| Politico | Likely R | July 6, 2020 |
| Daily Kos | Safe R | June 3, 2020 |
| RCP | Likely R | June 9, 2020 |
| Niskanen | Likely R | June 7, 2020 |

==== Results ====
2020 Minnesota's 8th congressional district election
| Party | Candidate | Votes | % |
|---|---|---|---|
| Republican | Pete Stauber (incumbent) | 223,432 | 56.7 |
| Democratic (DFL) | Quinn Nystrom | 147,853 | 37.6 |
| Grassroots—LC | Judith Schwartzbacker | 22,190 | 5.6 |
| Write-in | | 236 | 0.1 |
| Total votes | | 393,711 | 100.0 |
| Republican hold | | | |

== See also ==
- 2020 Minnesota elections

== Notes ==
Partisan clients

Official campaign websites

District 1

- Jim Hagedorn (R) for Congress
- Dan Feehan (DFL) for Congress Archived April 28, 2020, at the Wayback Machine
- Bill Rood (GLC) for Congress Archived September 13, 2020, at the Wayback Machine

District 2

- Angie Craig (DFL) for Congress
- Tyler Kistner (R) for Congress Archived September 26, 2020, at the Wayback Machine
- Adam Charles Weeks (LMN) for Congress Archived September 13, 2020, at the Wayback Machine

District 3

- Dean Phillips (DFL) for Congress
- Kendall Qualls (R) for Congress

District 4

- Betty McCollum (DFL) for Congress
- Gene Rechtzigel (R) for Congress

District 5

- Ilhan Omar (DFL) for Congress
- Lacy Johnson (R) for Congress
- Michael Moore (LMN) for Congress Archived September 13, 2020, at the Wayback Machine

District 6

- Tom Emmer (R) for Congress
- Tawnja Zahradka (DFL) for Congress

District 7

- Collin Peterson (DFL) for Congress
- Michelle Fischbach (R) for Congress

District 8

- Pete Stauber (R) for Congress
- Quinn Nystrom (DFL) for Congress Archived August 10, 2020, at the Wayback Machine
