= L. E. Scriven =

Laurence E. Scriven
- Born: November 4, 1931; United States
- Died: August 3, 2007 (aged 75); Minneapolis, Minnesota, U.S.
- Education: University of California, Berkeley; University of Delaware
- Known for: Fluid Mechanics; Coating Flows; Electron Microscopy
- Awards: Allan P. Colburn Award - AIChE (1960); National Academy of Engineering (1978); Josiah Willard Gibbs Lectureship of American Mathematical Society (1986); American Academy of Arts and Sciences (1991)
- Scientific career
- Fields: Chemical Engineer, Materials Science
- Workplaces: University of Minnesota
- Doctoral advisor: Robert Pigford
- Doctoral students: Robert A. Brown; Eric Kaler; Ronald G. Larson; Joseph A. Zasadzinski

Laurence Edward "Skip" Scriven (1931 – 2007) was an American chemical engineer, educator, and a regents professor in the department of chemical engineering and materials science at the University of Minnesota. He achieved numerous breakthroughs in the fields of fluid mechanics, capillary hydrodynamics, coating flows, and microscopy. His contributions to chemical engineering have been internationally recognized, and he was elected fellow of the National Academy of Engineering (1978), American Academy of Arts and Sciences (1991), and American Institute of Chemical Engineers. Scriven was awarded the Josiah Willard Gibbs Lectureship organized by the American Mathematical Society in 1986. Prior to his academic career, he published works related to bubbles and surface flows while he was employed by the Shell Development Company in Emeryville, California.

== Research and education ==
Scriven made contributions in the fields of capillary hydrodynamics, bubble growth dynamics, gradient theory, interfacial phenomena and the theory of bicontinuous structures, enhanced oil recovery, wetting transition, cryogenic electron microscopy, Galerkin weighted residuals in finite element methods, and coating process fundamentals.

His most highly cited papers include The Marangoni Effects (American Institute of Chemical Engineering Journal, 1959; Nature, 1960), Angular Momentum of Continua (Nature, 1961), Flow caused by an Air-lubricated Edge moving over Viscoelastic Liquid (Nature, 1973), a foundational explanation of the origin of bicontinuous structures (Nature, 1976), and a description of an apparatus that allows fast freezing of complex liquid specimens for cryomicroscopy (Journal of Electron Microscopy Technique, 1988). His 1988 paper "Physics and Applications of Dip Coating and Spin Coating" is widely referenced in various industries.

Scriven advised over 100 Ph.D. students during his career in the Department of Chemical Engineering and Materials Science at the University of Minnesota. He co-founded NSF Center for Interfacial Engineering at the University of Minnesota.

== Awards ==
Among the recognition given to him, recent awards include: American Chemical Society's Murphree Award, American Chemical Society's Roy W. Tess Award, American Institute of Chemical Engineers' Tallmadge Award, American Institute of Chemical Engineers' Founders Award, American Institute of Chemical Engineers' William Walker Award, and Federation of Societies of Coatings Technology's Roon Award(with Yue Ma, Benjamin J. Wiley, and H.T. Davis).

Scriven has written numerous articles of historical importance within the field of chemical engineering. He also shared some thoughts on the future of the field in an article:

In brief, the practice of chemical engineering, like seasonal foliage, changes; like individuals, the subdisciplines grow, mature, and give birth to others; the discipline like a species evolves, but the essence, like a tree, is invariant. For the better part of a century, the profession in the United States has broadened its base - now rejoining materials science - and built on it successfully to fulfill the needs of both the existing and the emerging chemical process technologies of each era. As past high technologies have matured, and turned senescent or moribund, the profession has again and again moved on to new frontiers, rapidly enough to avoid any danger of extinction. What factors are likely to be important for the next hundred years? Primarily those that have been important over the past hundred. My encounters with them leave me with two deep questions that remain largely unanswered. What constitutes an engineering discipline like chemical engineering? And what maintains the associated profession?

— L.E. Scriven, "Perspectives in Chemical Engineering", Advances in Chemical Engineering (1991)

== Key Publications ==
Scriven has authored numerous journal articles. Some examples are listed below.

- L.E. Scriven. "On the dynamics of phase growth", Chemical Engineering Science, 10(1–2), 1–13, (1959) on Citation Classic, Jul 28, 1980
- L.E. Scriven, C.V. Sternling. "The Marangoni Effects", Nature, 187, 186–188, (1960).
- L.E. Scriven. "Dynamics of a fluid interface Equation of motion for Newtonian surface fluids", Chemical Engineering Science, 12(2), 98, (1960).
- L.E. Scriven, C.V. Sternling. "On cellular convection driven by surface-tension gradients: effects of mean surface tension and surface viscosity", Journal of Fluid Mechanics, 19(3), 321–340, (1964).
- B. A. Finlayson, L. E. Scriven. "The method of weighted residuals—a review", Applied Mechanics Reviews, 19:735-48 (1966) on Citation Classic, Oct. 3, 1983
- Chun Huh, L.E. Scriven. "Hydrodynamic model of steady movement of a solid/liquid/fluid contact line", Journal of Colloid and Interface Science, 35(1), 85–101, (1971).
- L.E. Scriven. "Equilibrium bicontinuous structure", Nature, 263, 123–125, (1976).
- Perspectives in Chemical Engineering, edited by C. K. Colton (Academic Press, 1991, vol. 16, pp. 1–40)
- D.J. Norris, E.G. Arlinghaus, L. Meng, R. Heiny, L.E. Scriven. "Opaline Photonic Crystals: How Does Self‐Assembly Work?", Advanced Materials, 16(16), 1393, (2004).

== Legacy ==
In honor of Scriven, the International Society of Coating Science and Technology established the L. E. Scriven Young Investigator Award.

L. E. “Skip” Scriven Chair is an Endowed Professorship at the University of Minnesota.
