= Ron Larson (disambiguation) =

Ron Larson (born 1941), is a mathematics professor at Penn State Erie, The Behrend College, Pennsylvania.

Ron Larson may also refer to:

- Ron Larson (artist), American art director, album cover designer, and graphic artist

== See also ==
- Ronald G. Larson (born 1953), American professor of chemical engineering
- Ronnie Larsen, American playwright
