= Barbara Snyder =

Former president of Case Western Reserve University

Barbara R. Snyder
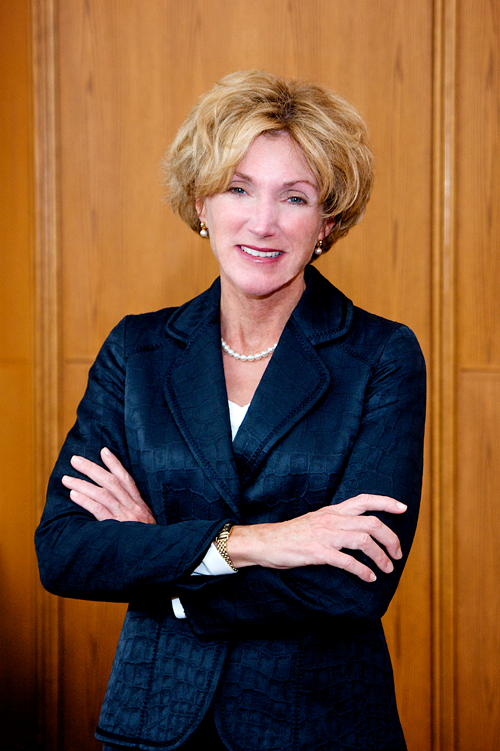
- Snyder in February 2013

8th President of the Association of American Universities
- Incumbent
- Assumed office October 1, 2020

7th President of Case Western Reserve University
- In office July 1, 2007 – October 1, 2020
- Preceded by: Edward M. Hundert; Gregory L. Eastwood (interim)
- Succeeded by: Eric Kaler; Scott Cowen (interim)

Personal details
- Born: July 23, 1955 (age 71)
- Spouse: Michael J. Snyder
- Education: Ohio State University (BA); University of Chicago (JD)

Barbara Rook Snyder is an American academic and president of the Association of American Universities. She is the former president of Case Western Reserve University. A legal scholar, Snyder was the first woman to serve as the Case Western's president. Earlier in her career, she served as provost of Ohio State University.

== Education ==
Snyder earned a bachelor's degree in sociology from Ohio State University and a Juris Doctor degree from the University of Chicago.

== Career ==
Snyder was executive vice president and provost of Ohio State University. During Snyder's tenure as the university president, CWRU overcame a $20 million budget deficit, increased fundraising by nearly $60 million, and increased research dollars by more than $15 million.

Following the announcement that Gordon Gee would retire as President of the Ohio State University effective July 1, 2013, speculation arose that Snyder, the former Provost and Executive Vice President of Ohio State, could succeed Gee. In response, Snyder said, "I am proud to be president of Case Western Reserve and intend to continue in this role for many years to come."

In 2011, Cleveland.com reported Barbara R. Snyder's total compensation for the year of 2009 was $778,874.
