= Howard Davis (chemical engineer) =

American chemical engineer

Howard Theodore Davis
- Born: August 2, 1937; Hendersonville, North Carolina
- Died: May 17, 2009; Minneapolis, Minnesota
- Education: University of Chicago; Furman University
- Known for: Surface Thermodynamics; Statistical Thermodynamics; Transport in Porous Media
- Awards: Walker Award - AIChE (1990); National Academy of Engineering (1988); Regents Professor (1997)
- Scientific career
- Fields: Chemical Engineer, Materials Science
- Workplaces: University of Minnesota
- Thesis: Some theoretical and experimental studies of irreversible processes in simple dense fluids (1962)
- Doctoral advisor: Stuart Rice
- Doctoral students: Eric Kaler; Ronald G. Larson; Joseph A. Zasadzinski

Howard Theodore "Ted" Davis (1937–2009) was an American chemical engineer and regents professor in the Department of Chemical Engineering and Materials Science (CEMS) at the University of Minnesota. He is known for his work in statistical thermodynamics, transport in porous media, and surface thermodynamics.

Davis was an author of more than 400 academic papers and five books, including the textbooks “Linear Algebra and Linear Operators in Engineering” (Academic Press, 2000, 1st Edition) and "Statistical Mechanics of Phases, Interfaces and Thin Films" (John Wiley & Sons, 1995, 1st Edition).

He served as the department head of CEMS for 15 years (1980-1995), followed by his leadership as Dean of the Institute of Technology (1995-2005), which is the University of Minnesota's college of physical science and engineering. In 2008, Davis became the director of the University of Minnesota's BioTechnology Institute.

== Early life and education ==
Davis grew up in the small town of Hendersonville, North Carolina. He was the child of an apple farm and textile mill worker. He received his B.S. in chemistry from Furman University in 1959 before completing his Ph.D. in chemistry at the University of Chicago in 1962 with advisor Stuart Rice on the topic of "Some theoretical and experimental studies of irreversible processes in simple dense fluids", part of which was later published as a book chapter. He later completed a year of post-doctoral studies at the Free University of Brussels with Nobel Laureate Ilya Prigogine before joining the faculty at the University of Minnesota in 1963.

== Tenure as dean ==
In 1995, Davis was named as dean of the Institute of Technology at the University of Minnesota, which was the university's college of engineering and physical sciences. During his leadership, he helped develop the Digital Technology Center. He also helped to create the University of Minnesota's Department of Biomedical Engineering. This was followed by the formation of degree programs in bio-based products engineering, computer engineering and biomedical engineering. In addition, he established a professional master's program in software and infrastructure systems engineering.

During his time as Dean of IT, the college underwent several major renovations, including the new Mechanical Engineering Building and the restoration of Walter Library. These additions expanded the capability of the college and provided locations for both the Science and Engineering Library as well as the Digital Technology Center. Davis stepped down after nine years in 2005 as the 3rd longest serving dean in the college's history.

In 2008, Davis accepted the role of Director of the BioTechnology Institute, the University of Minnesota's internal organization, focusing on advanced research, training, and interaction with industry in biological process technology, and he held this position until May 2009.

== Awards, honors, and legacy ==
In 1969 he was awarded a Guggenheim Fellowship.

In 1988, Davis was elected to the National Academy of Engineering (primary section Chemical, secondary section Materials). His NAE election citation noted:

For leadership in applying chemical physics, and in uniting chemical engineering and materials science teaching and research.

— Election Citation, NAE, 1988

In 1997, the leadership of the University of Minnesota promoted Davis to a full Professor. In 2008, the Minnesota Science and Technology Hall of Fame included him in its first class of inductees; this selection honors those Minnesotans that have had a lasting worldwide impact.

== Key publications ==
Davis has authored numerous journal articles in statistical mechanics, transport, fluid mechanics, and interfacial phenomena which includes but is not limited to:

- Davis, H. Ted; Rice, Stuart A; Meyer, Lothar (1962). "On the Kinetic Theory of Simple Dense Fluids. XI. Experimental and Theoretical Studies of Positive Ion Mobility in Liquid Ar, Kr, and Xe". The Journal of Chemical Physics. 37 (5): 947. Bibcode:1962JChPh..37..947D. doi:10.1063/1.1733251.
- White, Lloyd R; Davis, H. Ted (1967). "Thermal Conductivity of Molten Alkali Nitrates". The Journal of Chemical Physics. 47 (12): 5433. Bibcode:1967JChPh..47.5433W. doi:10.1063/1.1701811.
- Bongiorno, Vito; Davis, H. Ted (1975). "Modified van der Waals theory of fluid interfaces". Physical Review A. 12 (5): 2213. Bibcode:1975PhRvA..12.2213B. doi:10.1103/PhysRevA.12.2213.
- Davis, H. Ted (1977). "Capillary waves and the mean field theory of interfaces". The Journal of Chemical Physics. 67 (8): 3636–3641. Bibcode:1977JChPh..67.3636D. doi:10.1063/1.435301.
- Sahimi, Muhammad; Hughes, Barry D; Scriven, L. E; Davis, H. Ted (1983). "Real-space renormalization and effective-medium approximation to the percolation conduction problem". Physical Review B. 28 (1): 307–311. Bibcode:1983PhRvB..28..307S. doi:10.1103/PhysRevB.28.307.
- Somers, Susan A; Davis, H. Ted (1992). "Microscopic dynamics of fluids confined between smooth and atomically structured solid surfaces". The Journal of Chemical Physics. 96 (7): 5389. Bibcode:1992JChPh..96.5389S. doi:10.1063/1.462724.
- 'Gupta, Vishwas; Nivarthi, Sriram S.; McCormick, Alon V.; Davis, H. Ted (1995). "Evidence for single file diffusion of ethane in the molecular sieve AlPO4-5". Chemical Physics Letters. 247 (4–6): 596–600. Bibcode:1995CPL...247..596G. doi:10.1016/S0009-2614(95)01246-X.
- Maier, Robert S; Kroll, Daniel M; Bernard, Robert S; Howington, Stacy E; Peters, John F; Davis, H. Ted (2003). "Hydrodynamic dispersion in confined packed beds". Physics of Fluids. 15 (12): 3795. Bibcode:2003PhFl...15.3795M. doi:10.1063/1.1624836.

Davis was also the author of two books:

- Ted Davis, H.; Thomson, Kendall T. (June 26, 2000). Linear Algebra and Linear Operators in Engineering: with Applications in Mathematica. Elsevier Science. ISBN 978-0122063497.
- Ted Davis, H.; Davis, Howard Ted (January 11, 1996). Statistical Mechanics of Phases, Interfaces and Thin Films. Wiley. ISBN 978-0471185628.
