= Edward M. Hundert =

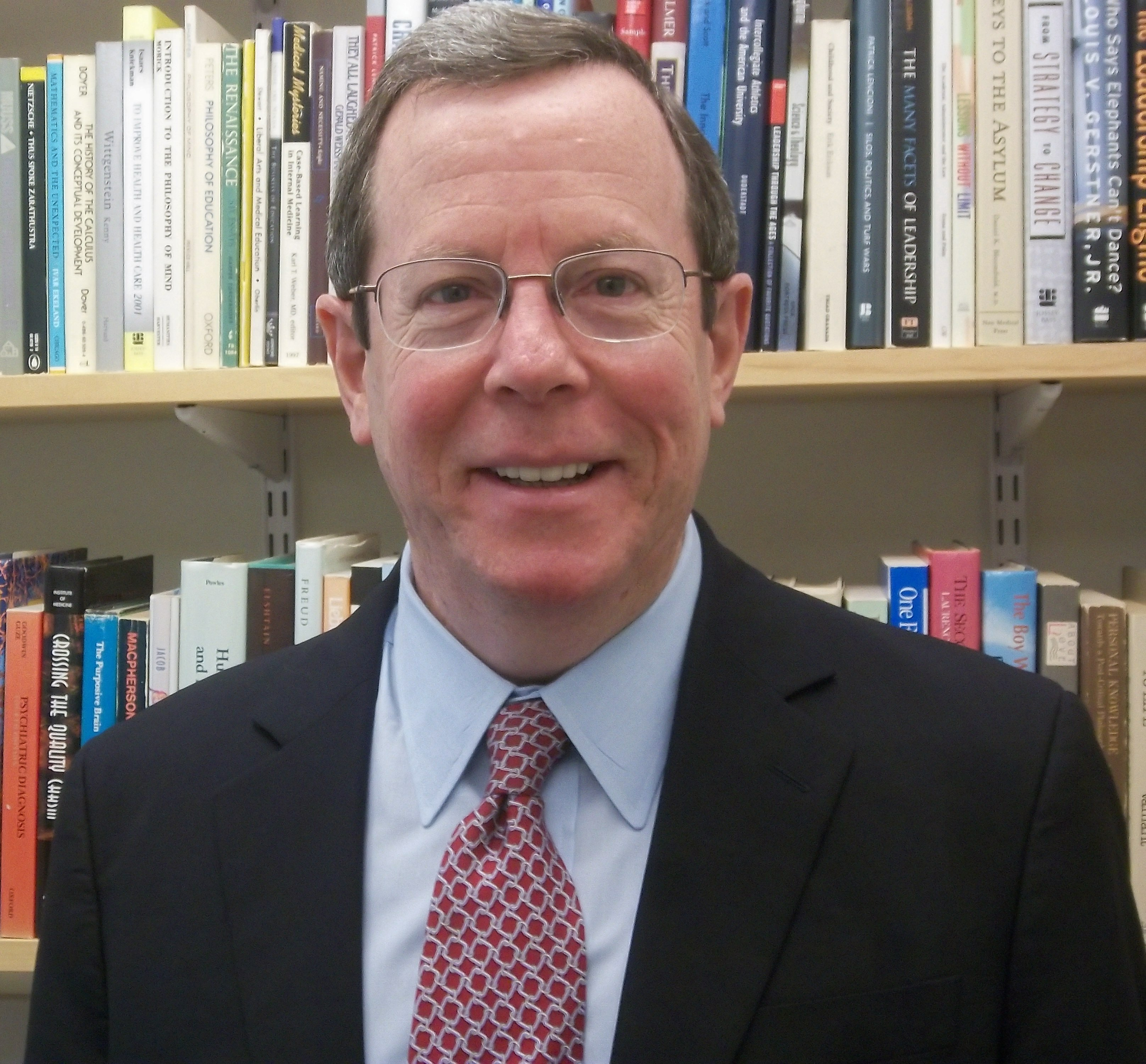
- Edward M. Hundert

6th President of the Case Western Reserve University
- In office August 1, 2002 – June 2, 2006
- Preceded by: David H. Auston; James W. Wagner (interim)
- Succeeded by: Barbara Snyder; Gregory L. Eastwood (interim)

Personal details
- Born: Woodbridge Township, New Jersey, US
- Spouse: Mary C. Hundert (married 1985)
- Children: 3
- Education: Yale University (BA); Oxford University (MA); Harvard University (MD)
- Occupation: Psychiatrist, ethicist, medical educator
- Known for: Dean for Medical Education, Harvard Medical School; President of Case Western Reserve University, 2002-2006
- Website: HMS profile page for Edward M. Hundert, MD

Edward M. Hundert is the Daniel D. Federman Professor in Residence of Global Health and Social Medicine and Medical Education at Harvard Medical School, where he is also Associate Director of the Center for Bioethics at HMS. He was the HMS Dean for Medical Education from 2014 until 2023.

== Early life and education ==
Born in Woodbridge Township, New Jersey, Hundert graduated from Yale University in 1978 with a degree in mathematics and the history of science and medicine. He attended Oxford University as a Marshall Scholar, earning a degree in philosophy, politics, and economics in 1980. He received his M.D. in 1984 from Harvard Medical School, where he remained to do his residency training in psychiatry at McLean Hospital.

== Professional ==
Hundert has spent most of his professional career at Harvard Medical School. Following residency training, he was appointed Director of Postgraduate and Continuing Medical Education at McLean Hospital and became involved in the development of the Harvard's New Pathway Curriculum. He then was Associate Dean for Student Affairs at Harvard Medical School from 1990 to 1997. He left Harvard for nine years in his 40s, spending 5 years at the University of Rochester, where he was dean of the School of Medicine and Dentistry, and 4 years at Case Western Reserve University, where he was president. He left Case in 2006 after the faculty members in arts and sciences voted overwhelmingly that they lacked confidence in him due to mounting deficits at the university and a management style that many faculty members said was secretive.

He returned to Harvard Medical School to lead a new curriculum in medical ethics and professionalism and to be Director of the Center for Teaching and Learning until 2014, when he was appointed Dean for Medical Education to lead the development of Harvard's Pathways curriculum.
