= Joseph A. Zasadzinski =

American chemical engineer

- Education: California Institute of Technology (BS); University of Minnesota (PhD)
- Known for: Designing vesosomes for drug delivery
- Scientific career
- Fields: Chemical engineering
- Workplaces: University of California, Santa Barbara; University of Minnesota
- Thesis: Liquid crystal structure by electron microscopy (1985)
- Doctoral advisors: Howard Davis; L. E. Scriven
- Notable students: Sarah L. Keller (post-doc)

Joseph A. Zasadzinski is an American chemical engineer and a professor of chemical engineering at the University of Minnesota where he holds the 3M Harry Heltzer Chair of Multidisciplinary Science and Technology since 2011.

== Education ==
He received a Bachelor of Science in chemical engineering from the California Institute of Technology in 1980. He was award a PhD in the same field after working under the supervision of professors Howard Davis and L. E. Scriven. After receiving his doctorate, Zasadzinski spent a year as a post-doctoral fellow at the AT&T Bell Laboratories.

== Career ==
In 1986, Zasadzinski joined the chemical engineering faculty at the University of California, Santa Barbara. He left UCSB in 2011 to return to the University of Minnesota to join the faculty there.

Zasadzinski is on the editorial board of the Biophysical Journal.

He was awarded the status of Fellow in the American Physical Society, after he was nominated by his Division of Biological Physics in 2008, for "applying physical principles of self-assembly, directed assembly and bio-mimicry to create well-controlled lipid structures such as unilamellar vesicles and "vesosomes" for biomedical applications such as targeted drug-delivery vehicles and treatments for respiratory diseases, and for developing new microscopies."

== Awards ==
- 1993 Burton Award of the Microscopy Society of America
- 2004 American Chemical Society Award in Colloid and Surface Science
- 2008 Fellow of the American Physical Society, Division of Biological Physics
- 2013 Avanti Award in Lipids of the Biophysical Society

== See also ==
- List of fellows of the American Physical Society (1998–2010)
