= Robert Bruininks =

President of the University of Minnesota (2002-2011)

Robert H. Bruininks

Interim President of the University of Minnesota
- In office August 1, 2002 – November 8, 2002
- Preceded by: Mark Yudof
- Succeeded by: Himself

15th President of the University of Minnesota
- In office November 8, 2002 – June 30, 2011
- Preceded by: Himself
- Succeeded by: Eric Kaler

Personal details
- Profession: University administrator

Robert H. Bruininks (/bruːnɪks/ BROO-nihks; born February 22, 1942) is a former president of the University of Minnesota. He was named president on November 8, 2002, after briefly serving as the interim president. He has been employed by the University of Minnesota since 1968. He was the 15th full-time president in the history of the University of Minnesota. He is married and has three adult sons.

Bruininks sent a university-wide email on May 5, 2010, stating that the '10-'11 school year would be his last as president of the university. He stepped down as president of the university on June 30, 2011, and returned to teaching as a professor in the Hubert H. Humphrey School of Public Affairs at the University of Minnesota. While there, Bruininks worked on issues of public leadership, human capital, and higher education policy until his retirement in 2013.

In 2015, the University of Minnesota building formerly known as the Science Teaching and Student Services Center (STSS) was renamed Robert H. Bruininks Hall in honor of the university's former president. The structure was originally completed in 2010 while Bruininks was still serving as president of the university. At the opening ceremony of the building in August 2010, Bruininks is quoted as saying, "It's appropriate that a building that supports science education and overlooks a great river would be built with principles of sustainability at the forefront."

== See also ==
- List of presidents of the University of Minnesota

Academic offices
Preceded by Mark Yudof	15th President of the University of Minnesota; 2002 – 2011	Succeeded by Eric W. Kaler
