= Eric Kaler =

President of Case Western Reserve University

Eric W. Kaler
- Kaler in 2025

11th President of Case Western Reserve University
- Incumbent
- Assumed office July 1, 2021
- Preceded by: Barbara Snyder

16th President of the University of Minnesota
- In office July 1, 2011 – June 30, 2019
- Preceded by: Robert Bruininks
- Succeeded by: Joan Gabel

Personal details
- Born: 1956 (age 69–70) Burlington, Vermont, U.S.
- Education: California Institute of Technology (BS); University of Minnesota (PhD)
- Profession: Scientist, professor and university administrator
- Website: case.edu/president/
- Scientific career
- Workplaces: University of Washington; University of Delaware; Stony Brook University; University of Minnesota; Case Western Reserve University
- Thesis: Surfactant Microstructures (1982)
- Doctoral advisors: H. Ted Davis; L. E. Scriven
- Notable students: Post-docs: Orlin D. Velev

Eric William Kaler (born 1956) is an American chemical engineer and university administrator who has been the president of Case Western Reserve University since 2021.

From 2011 to 2019, Kaler was president of the University of Minnesota. He then returned to scientific research and teaching in the university's Department of Chemical Engineering. Before coming to Minnesota, Kaler served from 2007 to 2011 as provost and senior vice president for academic affairs and vice president for Brookhaven affairs at Stony Brook University, New York. In the latter role he oversaw interactions with Brookhaven National Laboratory, which Stony Brook University and others co-manage with Battelle Memorial Institute.

== Early life and education ==
Kaler was born in Burlington, Vermont, in 1956 as an only child in a military family. His father served as a noncommissioned officer in the United States Air Force.

Kaler received his B.S. (1978) from California Institute of Technology and his Ph.D. in chemical engineering (1982) from the University of Minnesota under the direction of H. Ted Davis and L. E. Scriven.

== Early career ==
He was an assistant professor (1982–87) and associate professor (1987–89) of chemical engineering at the University of Washington in Seattle. He joined the chemical engineering faculty of the University of Delaware in 1989 and was promoted to professor in 1991. He was named the Elizabeth Inez Kelley Professor of Chemical Engineering in 1998, and was chair of the Chemical Engineering Department from 1996 to 2000. He served as dean of the College of Engineering at the University of Delaware from 2000 to 2007 before moving on to Stony Brook to become Provost. He was a visiting professor at the University of Graz, Austria in 1995.

== University of Minnesota presidency ==
When Eric Kaler took office on July 1, 2011, he became only the second alumnus to rise to the position of University of Minnesota president. He was appointed President of the University of Minnesota after Robert Bruininks during a period of decreased funding from the state legislature to the University of Minnesota. During his first year in office the state legislature reduced appropriations to higher education down to a level that were equivalent to the funding amounts from 1998.

=== Priorities and initiatives ===
In his second academic year, Kaler and the university, in partnership with the Minnesota Legislature, froze tuition for Minnesota-resident students. He proposed a set of innovative tax and tuition relief initiatives to aid students, their families, and donors, and also proposed performance measures that the university must meet to gain some of its state support. The State of Minnesota also invested in a new research program known as MnDRIVE, in the amount of about $18 million per year. MnDRIVE in its first funding cycle, was focused on research around clean water, robotics, neuroscience, and food. That request was expected to be heard by the DFL Party controlled Minnesota Legislature and Governor Mark Dayton during its 2013 session. Kaler's outreach to the Minnesota business community has earned him and the university recognition by the U.S. Department of Commerce and the White House.

In 2012, Secretary of Homeland Security Janet Napolitano named Kaler to the U.S. Department of Homeland Security Academic Advisory Council.

=== Controversies ===
In 2012, the Minnesota Daily, the university student newspaper, criticized the university athletic department, under then-Athletic Director Norwood Teague, for deciding to spend $800,000 to reschedule a football game with North Carolina to increase the football team's rankings.

The University of Minnesota was profiled by The Wall Street Journal in an analysis of higher education spending and mismanagement. According to the article, the University of Minnesota salary and employment records from 2001 through the spring of 2012 show that the university system added more than 1,000 administrators over that period. Their ranks grew 37%, more than twice as fast as the teaching corps and nearly twice as fast as the student body, the Journal reported. Growing under previous president Robert Bruininks, the Journal reported that under Kaler the University of Minnesota has the largest share of employees classified as "executive and managerial" among the nation's 72 "very-high-research" public universities in the 2011–12 academic year.

In the wake of The Wall Street Journal story and a commentary in The Washington Post (that was reprinted in the Minneapolis Star Tribune), Kaler wrote a response, detailing many of the accomplishments of the university in reducing administrative spending and holding down tuition. In it, Kaler wrote: "The articles did not report that, despite stunning state disinvestment, the university is more productive than at any time in recent history."

== Case Western Reserve University presidency ==
Eric Kaler became the president of Case Western Reserve University (CWRU) on July 1, 2021.

== Awards and activities ==
Kaler received one of the first Presidential Young Investigator Awards from the National Science Foundation in 1984 and has received numerous awards for his research, including the American Chemical Society (ACS) Award in Colloid or Surface Chemistry in 1998. He became a fellow of both the American Association for the Advancement of Science in 2001 and the ACS in 2010. He has served in a variety of positions in several professional societies, including the leadership ladder in the ACS Division of Colloid and Surface Chemistry, of which he was chair in 2006. He was cochair of both the 1997 and 2007 Colloid Symposia, held at the University of Delaware. He has chaired or cochaired three Gordon Research Conferences. Kaler was elected a member of the U.S. National Academy of Engineering in 2010 for the elucidation of structure-function relationships in surfactant systems that has led to novel formulations of complex, self-assembled media. In April 2014, Kaler was named to the American Academy of Arts and Sciences, one of the nation's most prestigious honorary societies. He was elected in two categories: for his work as a chemical engineer and as a higher education administrator.

Among other leadership activities, Kaler is a member of the Board of Directors for the Greater Cleveland Partnership and the Board of Trustees for University Circle Inc. He also serves on the All In Campus Democracy Challenge Presidents’ Council. Previously, he served as a member of the Guthrie Theater Board, the co-chair of Generation Next — which is a community partnership committed to closing the education achievement gap — Chair of the NCAA Division I Board of Directors, and Chair of the Big Ten Council of Presidents and Chancellors.

== See also ==
- List of presidents of the University of Minnesota

Academic offices
Preceded by Robert Bruininks	16th President of the University of Minnesota; 2011 – 2019	Succeeded by Joan Gabel
Preceded by Barbara Snyder; Scott Cowen (interim)	8th President of the Case Western Reserve University; 2021 – Present	Incumbent
