= Cryomicroscopy =

Microscopy below room temperature

Cryomicroscopy is a technique in which a microscope is equipped in such a fashion that the object intended to be inspected can be cooled to below room temperature. Technically, cryomicroscopy implies compatibility between a cryostat and a microscope. Most cryostats make use of a cryogenic fluid such as liquid helium or liquid nitrogen. There exists two common motivations for performing a cryomicroscopy. One is to improve upon the process of performing a standard microscopy. Cryogenic electron microscopy, for example, enables the studying of proteins with limited radiation damage. In this case, the protein structure may not change with temperature, but the cryogenic environment enables the improvement of the electron microscopy process. Another motivation for performing a cryomicroscopy is to apply the microscopy to a low-temperature phenomenon. A scanning tunnelling microscopy under a cryogenic environment, for example, allows for the studying of superconductivity, which does not exist at room temperature.

== History ==
Although optical microscopes have existed for centuries, cryomicroscopy is a modern methodology. In the 1950s, ice crystals were studied by installing an electron microscope inside of an igloo. Circa 1980, the adaption of the electron microscope, the vacuum, and the cryostat led to the conception of the modern cryomicroscopy. This development of the cryoelectron microscopy led to the awarding of the 2017 Nobel Prize in Chemistry to Jacques Dubochet, Joachim Frank, and Richard Henderson.

== Cryogenic electron microscopy ==
The processes of scanning and transmission electron microscopy carried out under cryogenic conditions are known as cryoSEM and cryoTEM, respectively.

== Cryogenic optical microscopy ==
Cryogenic environments are used in combination with different types of optical microscopy techniques. Cryogenic environments also minimize bleaching, which, in turn, improves the contrast of the microscopy technique. The growth of artificial ice crystals is, for example, studied by optical microscopy. With polarized light microscopy, the birefringence effect from, for example, orthorhombic domain structures, can be observed at cryogenic temperatures. In the field of biology, fluorescence microscopy has enabled resolution beyond the diffraction limit. The 2014 Nobel Prize in Chemistry was jointly awarded to Eric Betzig, Stefan Hell, and William E. Moerner for the development of super-resolved fluorescence microscopy.
