= Dan Feehan =

Australian rules footballer

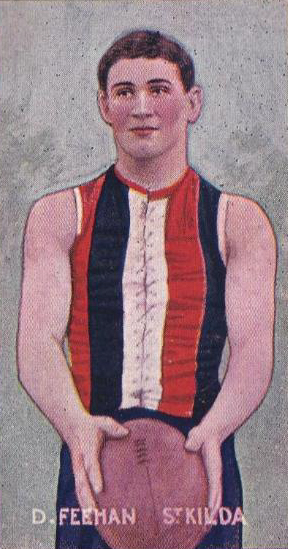
- Cigarette card of Feehan in 1906

Personal information
- Full name: Daniel Matthew Feehan
- Born: 7 February 1880; Daylesford, Victoria
- Died: 21 March 1946 (aged 66); Windsor, Victoria
- Original team: South Ballarat
- Position: Utility

Playing career^{1}
Years	Club	Games (Goals)
1904–10	St Kilda	85 (9)
- ^{1} Playing statistics correct to the end of 1910.

Daniel Matthew Feehan (7 February 1880 – 21 March 1946) was an Australian rules footballer who played with St Kilda in the Victorian Football League (VFL).
