= Ronald G. Larson =

American polymer researcher

Ronald Gary Larson
- Born: 30 March 1953 (age 73)
- Education: University of Minnesota
- Awards: Walker Award, AIChE (2020) American Physical Society Polymer Physics Award (2019); Fellow, Society of Rheology (2015); Attwood Award, University of Michigan (2013); Fellow, American Institute of Chemical Engineers (2006); National Academy of Engineering (2003); Bingham Medal (2002); Alpha Chi Sigma Award, AIChE (2000); Prudential Distinguished Visiting Fellow, University of Cambridge (1996); Fellow of the American Physical Society (1994) Distinguished Member of Technical Staff, Bell Labs (1988)
- Scientific career
- Fields: Chemical Engineering; Fluid Mechanics; Rheology
- Workplaces: University of Michigan; Bell Labs
- Doctoral advisor: L. E. Scriven; H. T. Davis

Ronald G. Larson is George G. Brown Professor of Chemical Engineering and Alfred H. White Distinguished University Professor at the University of Michigan, where he holds joint appointments in macromolecular science and engineering, biomedical engineering, and mechanical engineering. He is internationally recognized for his research contributions to the fields of polymer physics and complex fluid rheology, especially in the development of theory and computational simulations. Notably, Larson and collaborators discovered new types of viscoelastic instabilities for polymer molecules and developed predictive theories for their flow behavior. He has written numerous scientific papers and two books on these subjects, including a 1998 textbook, "The Structure and Rheology of Complex Fluids".

He is a fellow of the American Physical Society, the American Institute of Chemical Engineers, Bingham medalist and the Society of Rheology. He was also elected a member of the National Academy of Engineering (2003) for elucidating the flow properties of complex fluids at the molecular and continuum levels through theory and experiment.

== Academic career ==
Larson received a B.S. in 1975, an M.S. in 1977, and a Ph.D. in 1980, all in chemical engineering from the University of Minnesota. Before joining the University of Michigan in 1996, he was a Member of the Technical Staff at Bell Laboratories from 1980 to 1996. Larson served as the Chair of the Department of Chemical Engineering of the University of Michigan from 2000 to 2008. He is currently the George G. Brown Professor and Alfred H. White Distinguished University Professor of Chemical Engineering, and is a core member of the Biointerfaces Institute.

Larson was the President of the Society of Rheology (SOR) from 1997 to 1999, and served on the Executive Committee of SOR during the period of 1994-2001. He is a fellow of the American Physical Society (APS), and was the chair of the APS Division of Polymers in 2010. He is a member of the American Chemical Society (ACS), the American Association for the Advancement of Science (AAAS), and the American Institute of Chemical Engineers (AIChE).

== Research contributions ==
Larson is an expert in the theory and simulations of rheology, fluid mechanics, and transport phenomena. His research contributions are in self-assembling soft matter, especially polymers, colloids, surfactant-containing fluids, liquid crystalline polymers, biological macromolecules such as DNA, proteins, and polyelectrolytes. Larson (along with Susan Muller at UC Berkeley and Eric Shaqfeh at Stanford) is known for the discovery of fluid mechanical instabilities of polymeric fluids in curved streamlines due to polymer stretching. These types of streamlines, commonly found in Taylor-Couette flows, are of great importance to the polymer processing industry. Analogous instabilities have been known for over a century for ordinary fluids such as air and water, and these instabilities drive common phenomena such as weather patterns, as well as vortices and other phenomena in common industrial flows of liquids. He has developed molecular constitutive equations for entangled polymers, as well as many predictive theories for nonlinear rheology of branched polymers, polymers unraveling in shear and extensional flows, polymer drag reduction, shear-induced alignment transitions in block copolymers, slip and cavitation in polymer solutions and melts, and arrested tumbling of liquid crystalline polymers. These methods have been used worldwide by researchers to understand and predict the flow properties of polymeric fluids.

Larson is the sole author of two textbooks, "Constitutive Equations for Polymer Melts and Solutions", and "The Structure and Rheology of Complex Fluids". He has also co-authored with John Dealy and Daniel Read on the book, "Structure and Rheology of Molten Polymers".

According to Google Scholar, Larson's publications have received over 42,500 citations and his h-index is 87.

== Awards and honors ==
Larson has received a significant number of awards and honors which include:

- William H. Walker Award, AIChE (2020)
- Fellow of the Society of Rheology (2015)
- Polymer Physics Prize, American Physical Society (2019)
- Stephen S. Attwood Award, College of Engineering, University of Michigan (2013)
- Fellow of the American Institute of Chemical Engineers (2006)
- Election to the National Academy of Engineering (2003)
- Bingham Medal Society of Rheology (2002)
- Alpha Chi Sigma Award, AIChE (2000)
- Outstanding Publication Award, Journal of Rheology (1999)
- Excellence Award, Chemical Engineering at University of Michigan (1998)
- Prudential Distinguished Visiting Fellow at the University of Cambridge(1996)
- Fellow of the American Physical Society (1994)
- Distinguished Member of Technical Staff at Bell Laboratories (1988)

== Selected publications ==
- A. Datta, V. S. Tanmay, G. X. Tan, G. W. Reynolds, S. N. Jamadagni, & R. G. Larson. Characterizing the rheology, slip, and velocity profiles of lamellar gel networks. Journal of Rheology 64(4), 851 (2020).
- Y. Wei, M. J. Solomon &, R. G. Larson. A multimode structural kinetics constitutive equation for the transient rheology of thixotropic elasto-viscoplastic fluids. Journal of Rheology 62, 321 (2018).
- L. C. Hsiao, S. Jamali, E. Glynos, P.F. Green, R.G. Larson, & M.J. Solomon. Rheological state diagrams for rough colloids in shear flow. Physical Review Letters 119, 158001 (2017).
- X. Tang, P. H, Koenig &, R. G. Larson. Molecular Dynamics Simulations of Sodium Dodecyl Sulfate Micelles in Water: The Effect of the Force Field. The Journal of Physical Chemistry B 118(14), 3864 (2014).
- H. Hu & R.G. Larson. Marangoni effect reverses coffee-ring depositions. The Journal of Physical Chemistry B 110(14), 7090 (2006).
- T. C. B. McLeish & R. G. Larson. Molecular constitutive equations for a class of branched polymers: The pom-pom polymer. Journal of Rheology 42(1), 81 (1998).
- R. G. Larson. Instabilities in viscoelastic flows. Rheologica Acta 31(3), 213 (1992).
- R. G. Larson, S. J. Muller & E. S. G. Shaqfeh. A purely elastic instability in Taylor-Couette flow. Journal of Fluid Mechanics 218, 573 (1990).
