= National Register of Historic Places listings in Steuben County, New York =

Location of Steuben County in New York

List of the National Register of Historic Places listings in Steuben County, New York

This is intended to be a complete list of properties and districts listed on the National Register of Historic Places in Steuben County, New York. The locations of National Register properties and districts (at least for all showing latitude and longitude coordinates below) may be seen in a map by clicking on "Map of all coordinates".

This National Park Service list is complete through NPS recent listings posted April 24, 2026.

Contents: Counties in New York
Albany (Albany) – Allegany – Bronx – Broome – Cattaraugus – Cayuga – Chautauqua – Chemung – Chenango – Clinton – Columbia – Cortland – Delaware – Dutchess (Poughkeepsie, Rhinebeck) – Erie (Buffalo) – Essex – Franklin – Fulton – Genesee – Greene – Hamilton – Herkimer – Jefferson – Kings – Lewis – Livingston – Madison – Monroe (Rochester) – Montgomery – Nassau – New York (Below 14th Street, 14th to 59th Streets, 59th to 110th Streets, Above 110th Street, Islands) – Niagara (Niagara Falls) – Oneida – Onondaga (Syracuse) – Ontario – Orange – Orleans – Oswego – Otsego – Putnam – Queens – Rensselaer – Richmond – Rockland – St. Lawrence – Saratoga – Schenectady – Schoharie – Schuyler – Seneca – Steuben – Suffolk – Sullivan – Tioga – Tompkins – Ulster – Warren – Washington – Wayne – Westchester (Northern, Southern, New Rochelle, Peekskill, Yonkers) – Wyoming – Yates

== Listings county-wide ==
| | Name on the Register | Image | Date listed | Location | City or town | Description |
|---|---|---|---|---|---|---|
| 1 | Addison Village Hall | Addison Village Hall | April 23, 1980 (#80002771) | Tuscarora and South Sts. 42°06′17″N 77°14′06″W | Addison | It was demolished in 1994 and the site is now occupied by the Old Village Hall Memorial Park. |
| 2 | Adsit House | | February 20, 2003 (#03000047) | 34 Main St. 42°19′42″N 77°39′49″W | Hornell | The house was demolished on June 15, 2010. |
| 3 | James H. Bolton House | James H. Bolton House | February 23, 2015 (#15000034) | 117 W. Washington St., 42°20′13″N 77°19′34″W | Bath | Well-preserved 1909 Queen Anne Style house has many of its original interior finishings. |
| 4 | Campbell-Rumsey House | Campbell-Rumsey House | September 30, 1983 (#83001795) | 225 E. Steuben St. 42°19′58″N 77°18′27″W | Bath | |
| 5 | Canisteo Living Sign | Canisteo Living Sign | July 16, 2004 (#04000707) | Southeast side of hill, north of Cemetery Rd. off Greenwood St. 42°15′59″N 77°36′53″W | Canisteo | |
| 6 | Church of the Redeemer | Church of the Redeemer | November 12, 1992 (#92001577) | Junction of Park and Wall Sts. 42°06′30″N 77°13′58″W | Addison | |
| 7 | Cobblestone House | Cobblestone House | September 30, 1983 (#83001796) | 120 W. Washington St. 42°20′15″N 77°19′28″W | Bath | |
| 8 | Corning Armory | Corning Armory | May 18, 2003 (#03000411) | 127 Centerway; 42°08′54″N 77°03′16″W | Corning | |
| 9 | Cottages at Central Point | Cottages at Central Point | October 20, 2011 (#11000754) | 14681–14697 Keuka Village Rd. 42°30′01″N 77°06′45″W | Wayne | |
| 10 | Davenport Library | Davenport Library | September 30, 1983 (#83001797) | W. Morris St. 42°19′58″N 77°19′28″W | Bath | |
| 11 | Delaware, Lackawanna & Western Railroad Station | Delaware, Lackawanna & Western Railroad Station | November 21, 1991 (#91001674) | Junction of Steuben St. and Victory Hwy. 42°09′44″N 77°05′28″W | Painted Post | |
| 12 | District School Number Five | District School Number Five | March 21, 2001 (#01000242) | 9436 Dry Run Rd. 42°13′24″N 77°07′58″W | Campbell | |
| 13 | Erie Freighthouse Historic District | Erie Freighthouse Historic District | March 18, 1991 (#91000235) | Junction of Cohocton St. and Railroad Ave. 42°20′00″N 77°19′34″W | Bath | |
| 14 | Erwin Town Hall | Erwin Town Hall | April 28, 2022 (#100007682) | 117 West Water St. 42°09′28″N 77°05′40″W | Painted Post | |
| 15 | First Baptist Church of Painted Post | First Baptist Church of Painted Post | February 5, 1999 (#99000088) | 130 W. Water St. 42°09′30″N 77°05′40″W | Painted Post | |
| 16 | The First Baptist Society of Bath | The First Baptist Society of Bath | June 12, 2013 (#13000372) | 14 Howell St., 42°20′05″N 77°19′17″W | Bath | |
| 17 | Gansevoort/East Steuben Streets Historic District | Gansevoort/East Steuben Streets Historic District | September 30, 1983 (#83001798) | E. Steuben and Gansevoort Sts. 42°20′01″N 77°18′54″W | Bath | |
| 18 | Germania Wine Cellars | Germania Wine Cellars | November 2, 2000 (#00001289) | 8299 Pleasant Valley Rd. 42°24′12″N 77°14′59″W | Hammondsport | |
| 19 | Gold Seal Winery | Gold Seal Winery | November 28, 2010 (#10000946) | West Lake Road; 42°27′24″N 77°10′50″W | Hammondsport vicinity | |
| 20 | George W. Hallock House | George W. Hallock House | September 24, 2004 (#04001052) | 16 W. William St. 42°20′15″N 77°19′14″W | Bath | |
| 21 | Hammondsport Union Free School | Hammondsport Union Free School | May 15, 2008 (#08000411) | 41 Lake St. 42°24′28″N 77°13′24″W | Hammondsport | |
| 22 | Haverling Farm House | Haverling Farm House | September 30, 1983 (#83001799) | 313 Haverling St. 42°20′42″N 77°19′06″W | Bath | |
| 23 | Hornell Armory | Hornell Armory | May 6, 1980 (#80002772) | 100 Seneca St. 42°19′55″N 77°39′42″W | Hornell | |
| 24 | Hornell Public Library | Hornell Public Library | February 24, 1975 (#75001230) | 64 Genesee St. 42°19′41″N 77°39′28″W | Hornell | |
| 25 | Jenning's Tavern | Jenning's Tavern | September 20, 1973 (#73001270) | 59 W. Pulteney St. 42°09′05″N 77°03′51″W | Corning | |
| 26 | Larrowe House | Larrowe House | December 7, 1989 (#89002088) | S. Main St./US 415; 42°29′55″N 77°29′42″W | Cohocton | |
| 27 | Liberty Street Historic District | Liberty Street Historic District | September 30, 1983 (#83001800) | Roughly Liberty St. from E. Morris St. to Haverling St. 42°20′06″N 77°19′08″W | Bath | |
| 28 | Lincoln School | Lincoln School | November 17, 2015 (#15000803) | 373 Canisteo Ave. 42°18′58″N 77°39′50″W | Hornell | Well-preserved 1924 neighborhood school used for more than 50 years |
| 29 | Main Street Historic District | Main Street Historic District | April 26, 1996 (#96000488) | Main St. from the Canisteo River to the junction of Main, Steuben, Tuscarora, South Sts. and Valerio Pkwy. 42°06′21″N 77°14′04″W | Addison | |
| 30 | Mallory Mill | Mallory Mill | December 9, 1999 (#99001545) | Pulteney St. 42°24′39″N 77°13′36″W | Hammondsport | |
| 31 | Maple Street Historic District | Maple Street Historic District | December 6, 1996 (#96001441) | Roughly, Maple St. from Academy Rd. to Curtis Sq. Park; 42°06′34″N 77°13′48″W | Addison | |
| 32 | Market Street Historic District | Market Street Historic District | March 1, 1974 (#74001307) | Market St. from Chestnut St. to Wall St. 42°08′35″N 77°03′14″W | Corning | |
| 33 | McMaster House | McMaster House | September 30, 1983 (#83001801) | 207 E. Washington St. 42°20′12″N 77°18′37″W | Bath | |
| 34 | Henry C. Myrtle House | Henry C. Myrtle House | March 31, 2014 (#14000093) | 7663 Cty. Rd. 13; 42°22′23″N 77°18′29″W | Bath | |
| 35 | New York State Soldiers' and Sailors' Home–Bath Veterans Administration Center Historic District | New York State Soldiers' and Sailors' Home–Bath Veterans Administration Center Historic District | January 23, 2013 (#12001208) | 76 Veterans Ave. 42°20′37″N 77°20′46″W | Bath | |
| 36 | Northrup Hill School District 10 | Northrup Hill School District 10 | February 12, 1999 (#99000196) | Learn Rd. 42°08′51″N 77°22′30″W | Rathbone | |
| 37 | Pleasant Valley Wine Company | Pleasant Valley Wine Company | November 18, 1980 (#80002773) | SR 88; 42°24′04″N 77°15′15″W | Rheims | |
| 38 | Potter-Van Camp House | Potter-Van Camp House | September 30, 1983 (#83001802) | 4 W. Washington St. 42°20′14″N 77°19′11″W | Bath | |
| 39 | Prattsburgh Commercial Historic District | | May 30, 2023 (#100008996) | 10-28 West Main St. and 16 Federman Ln. 42°31′23″N 77°17′20″W | Prattsburgh | |
| 40 | Presbyterian Church of Atlanta | Presbyterian Church of Atlanta | February 17, 2010 (#10000030) | 2 Main Street; 42°33′14″N 77°28′23″W | Atlanta | |
| 41 | Pulteney Square Historic District | Pulteney Square Historic District | November 18, 1999 (#99001364) | Roughly surrounds Pulteney Sq. 42°24′34″N 77°13′22″W | Hammondsport | |
| 42 | Martin A. Quick House | Martin A. Quick House | March 31, 2014 (#14000094) | 123 W. Morris St. 42°20′01″N 77°19′30″W | Bath | |
| 43 | Reuben Robie House | Reuben Robie House | September 30, 1983 (#83001803) | 16 W. Washington St. 42°20′15″N 77°19′17″W | Bath | |
| 44 | Rockland Silk Mill | Rockland Silk Mill | October 20, 2021 (#100007076) | 18 North Main St. 42°19′47″N 77°40′02″W | Hornell | |
| 45 | Rowe House | Rowe House | February 19, 2008 (#08000039) | 11763 Rowe Rd. 42°34′11″N 77°29′09″W | Wayland | |
| 46 | St. Vincent de Paul Roman Catholic Church Complex | St. Vincent de Paul Roman Catholic Church Complex | February 6, 2025 (#100011440) | 222 Dodge Avenue, 109 Ellicott Street, and 108 Griffith Street; 42°09′19″N 77°03′55″W | Corning | |
| 47 | Sedgwick House | Sedgwick House | September 30, 1983 (#83001804) | 101 Haverling St. 42°20′27″N 77°19′06″W | Bath | |
| 48 | William Shepherd House | William Shepherd House | September 30, 1983 (#83001805) | 110 W. Washington St. 42°20′15″N 77°19′24″W | Bath | |
| 49 | Southside Historic District | Southside Historic District | February 20, 1998 (#98000137) | Roughly bounded by NY 17, Chemung St., Spencer Hill, and Washington St. 42°08′21″N 77°03′21″W | Corning | |
| 50 | St. Ann's Federation Building | St. Ann's Federation Building | May 29, 2001 (#01000552) | 38 Broadway; 42°19′33″N 77°39′38″W | Hornell | |
| 51 | Temple Beth-El | Temple Beth-El | February 16, 2016 (#16000021) | 12 Church St. 42°09′25″N 77°47′45″W | Hornell | 1946 synagogue, currently vacant, reflects Jewish settlement in small cities across upstate. |
| 52 | Town Line Church and Cemetery | Town Line Church and Cemetery | November 20, 2000 (#00001317) | Cty Rte. 119; 42°10′33″N 77°20′37″W | Cameron Mills | |
| 53 | US Post Office-Bath | US Post Office-Bath | November 17, 1988 (#88002454) | 101 Liberty St. 42°20′08″N 77°19′08″W | Bath | |
| 54 | US Post Office-Corning | US Post Office-Corning | November 17, 1988 (#88002474) | 129 Walnut St. 42°08′34″N 77°03′28″W | Corning | |
| 55 | US Post Office-Hornell | US Post Office-Hornell | December 8, 1997 (#97001458) | 50 Seneca St. 42°19′45″N 77°39′42″W | Hornell | |
| 56 | US Post Office-Painted Post | US Post Office-Painted Post | May 11, 1989 (#88002395) | 135 N. Hamilton St. 42°09′30″N 77°05′37″W | Painted Post | |
| 57 | Village of Hammondsport Historic District | | December 13, 2024 (#100009603) | Bauder Ave, Church St., Curtiss Ave, Davis Ave, Grape St., Lake St., Liberty St., Main St., Mechanic St., Myrtle Ave, Orchard St., Pulteney St., Shethar St., Thorpe St., Vine St., Water St, Wheeler Ave, William St. 42°24′29″N 77°13′26″W | Hammondsport | |
| 58 | M. J. Ward Feed Mill Complex | M. J. Ward Feed Mill Complex | March 18, 1991 (#91000236) | 1-9 Cameron St. 42°19′57″N 77°19′24″W | Bath | |
| 59 | Western New York Wine Company | | September 10, 2014 (#14000585) | 9683 Middle Rd. 42°28′16″N 77°10′52″W | Pulteney | Late 19th-century winery built by German immigrant who realized the Finger Lakes had potential as a vinicultural region |
| 60 | William Wombough House | William Wombough House | July 3, 2003 (#03000593) | 145 E. Front St. 42°06′52″N 77°13′07″W | Addison | |
| 61 | Wood Road Metal Truss Bridge | | March 15, 2005 (#05000169) | Wood Rd. over Cohocton River; 42°15′09″N 77°13′02″W | Campbell | |
| 62 | World War Memorial Library | World War Memorial Library | March 31, 1995 (#95000361) | 149 Pine St. 42°08′30″N 77°03′21″W | Corning | |
| 63 | Timothy M. Younglove Octagon House | Timothy M. Younglove Octagon House | August 22, 2002 (#02000877) | 8329 Pleasant Valley Rd. 42°24′17″N 77°14′37″W | Urbana | |

== Former listings ==
| | Name on the Register | Image | Date listed | Date removed | Location | City or town | Description |
|---|---|---|---|---|---|---|---|
| 1 | William Erwin House | | April 11, 1980 (#80002774) | October 24, 1985 | 508 Water St. | Riverside | Destroyed by fire in 1982 after being struck by lightning. |

== See also ==
- National Register of Historic Places listings in New York
