= Central Point =

Central Point may refer to:

- Central Point, Oregon, a city
- Central Point, Virginia, an unincorporated community
- Central Point (skyscraper), a building in Warsaw, Poland
- Central Point Software, a former software utilities maker acquired by Symantec

== See also ==
- Cottages at Central Point, on Keuka Lake in Steuben County, New York
- Graph center
- Center Point (disambiguation)
