= Davenport Library =

Davenport Library may refer to:

- Davenport Public Library, Davenport, Iowa
- Davenport Library (Bath, New York)
