= William Spring Hubbell =

American politician

William Hubbell
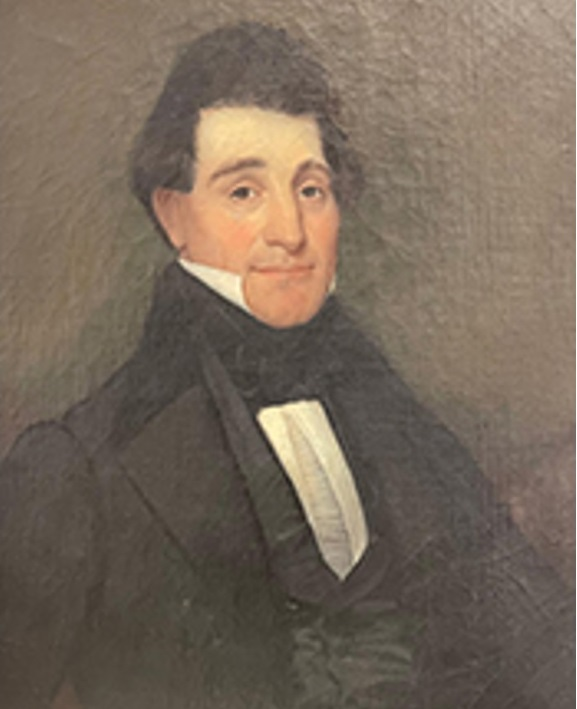

Member of the U.S. House of Representatives from New York's 30th district
- In office March 4, 1843, to March 4, 1845
- Preceded by: John Young
- Succeeded by: Martin Grover

Personal details
- Born: William Spring Hubbell; January 17, 1801 Painted Post, New York
- Died: November 16, 1873 (aged 72) Bath, New York
- Party: Democratic
- Profession: Politician

William Spring Hubbell (January 17, 1801 – November 16, 1873) was an American politician and Democratic member of the U.S. House of Representatives from New York, serving one term from 1843 to 1845.

== Biography ==
He was born in Painted Post (Steuben County), New York. He was postmaster and later town clerk of Bath, New York, then a member of the state assembly in 1841.

=== Congress ===
He was elected as a Democrat to the 28th Congress (March 4, 1843 – March 3, 1845), and was a delegate to the Democratic National Convention at Charleston, South Carolina, in 1860.

=== Death and legacy ===
William Spring Hubbell died in Bath, New York. His home at Bath, known as the George W. Hallock House, was listed on the National Register of Historic Places in 2004.

U.S. House of Representatives
Preceded by John Young	Member of the U.S. House of Representatives from New York's 30th congressional district 1843–1845	Succeeded by Martin Grover
