= Robert Campbell (New York politician) =

American politician

Lieutenant Governor of New York
- In office January 1, 1859 – December 31, 1862
- Governor: Edwin D. Morgan
- Preceded by: Henry R. Selden
- Succeeded by: David R. Floyd-Jones

Personal details
- Born: May 1, 1808 Bath, Steuben County, New York, U.S.
- Died: July 16, 1870 (aged 62) Bath, Steuben County, New York, U.S.
- Resting place: Grove Cemetery, Bath, Steuben County, New York
- Party: Democratic (-1848); Free Soil (1848-1854); Republican (1854-1870)

Robert Campbell (May 1, 1808 in Bath, Steuben County, New York – July 16, 1870 in Bath, Steuben County, New York) was an American politician.

== Life ==
Campbell was the son of Robert Campbell Sr. (d. 1849) who came from Glasgow, Scotland, to the United States and settled at Bath in 1794. He was educated at Geneva Academy and College, then studied law, was admitted to the bar and commenced practice at Bath. He married Frances Fowler, and they had the sons Clarence Campbell and Frank Campbell.

He was delegate to the New York State Constitutional Convention of 1846 as a Democrat, but became a Free Soiler in 1848 and later joined the Republican Party. He was Lieutenant Governor of New York from 1859 to 1862 under Governor Edwin D. Morgan.

He was buried at Grove Cemetery in Bath. His home at Bath, known as the Campbell-Rumsey House, was listed on the National Register of Historic Places in 1983.

== Sources ==
- Political Graveyard
- NY History Bio of Frank Campbell
- Biographical Sketches of the State Officers and Members of the Legislature in the State of New York in 1859 by Wm. D. Murphy (pages 9ff; C. Van Benthuysen, Albany NY, 1859)

Political offices
Preceded by Henry R. Selden	Lieutenant Governor of New York; 1859–1862	Succeeded by David R. Floyd-Jones
