= Pulteney, New York =

- Town
- Location within the state of New York
- Coordinates: 42°31′51″N 77°11′15″W
- Country: United States
- State: New York
- County: Steuben

Area
  - Total: 36.46 sq mi (94.42 km^{2})
  - Land: 33.14 sq mi (85.83 km^{2})
  - Water: 3.32 sq mi (8.59 km^{2})
- Elevation: 1,447 ft (441 m)

Population (2020)
  - Total: 1,260 ▼
  - Estimate (2021): 1,250
  - Density: 38.5/sq mi (14.87/km^{2})
- Time zone: UTC-5 (Eastern (EST))
  - Summer (DST): UTC-4 (EDT)
- ZIP code: 14874
- Area code: 607
- FIPS code: 36-59982
- GNIS feature ID: 0979401
- Website: Town website

Pulteney is a town in Steuben County, New York, United States. The population was 1,260 at the 2020 census. The name is derived from the name of the original pioneer tract of land.

The Town of Pulteney is in the northeastern part of the county, northeast of Bath.

== History ==
The first settlers arrived in this part of the Pulteney Tract in approximately 1797. For a time the area was known as "Harmonyville." However, the actual town was formed in 1808 from the Town of Bath. Part of Pulteney was used to form the Town of Prattsburgh (1813) and part of the Town of Urbana (1848).

The "Pulteney Purchase" or "Pulteney Tract" was a section of land in the region of Steuben County purchased from Robert Morris by several English investors including Sir William Pulteney, 5th Baronet called "The Pulteney Association."

The Western New York Wine Company was listed on the National Register of Historic Places in 2014.

== Geography ==
According to the United States Census Bureau, the town has a total area of 36.4 square miles (94 km^{2}), of which 33.2 square miles (86 km^{2}) is land and 3.2 square miles (8.3 km^{2}) (8.76%) is water.

The town is on the western side of Keuka Lake, one of the Finger Lakes. The northern and eastern town lines are part of the border of Yates County.

New York State Route 54A is a north–south highway in the eastern part of the town.

== Demographics ==
Historical population
Census	Pop.	Note	%±
1820	1,162		—
1830	1,730		48.9%
1840	1,781		2.9%
1850	1,815		1.9%
1860	1,470		−19.0%
1870	1,393		−5.2%
1880	1,660		19.2%
1890	1,769		6.6%
1900	1,590		−10.1%
1910	1,316		−17.2%
1920	1,062		−19.3%
1930	983		−7.4%
1940	957		−2.6%
1950	1,138		18.9%
1960	1,106		−2.8%
1970	1,167		5.5%
1980	1,274		9.2%
1990	1,417		11.2%
2000	1,405		−0.8%
2010	1,285		−8.5%
2020	1,260		−1.9%
2021 (est.)	1,250		−0.8%
U.S. Decennial Census

As of the census of 2000, there were 1,405 people, 566 households, and 400 families residing in the town. The population density was 42.3 inhabitants per square mile (16.3/km^{2}). There were 1,118 housing units at an average density of 33.6 per square mile (13.0/km^{2}). The racial makeup of the town was 98.65% White, 0.50% African American, 0.07% from other races, and 0.78% from two or more races. Hispanic or Latino of any race were 1.07% of the population.

There were 566 households, out of which 28.4% had children under the age of 18 living with them, 58.0% were married couples living together, 6.9% had a female householder with no husband present, and 29.3% were non-families. 23.9% of all households were made up of individuals, and 9.9% had someone living alone who was 65 years of age or older. The average household size was 2.48 and the average family size was 2.90.

In the town, the population was spread out, with 24.6% under the age of 18, 5.4% from 18 to 24, 24.8% from 25 to 44, 29.6% from 45 to 64, and 15.5% who were 65 years of age or older. The median age was 42 years. For every 100 females, there were 104.5 males. For every 100 females age 18 and over, there were 102.5 males.

The median income for a household in the town was $37,115, and the median income for a family was $42,438. Males had a median income of $27,026 versus $21,106 for females. The per capita income for the town was $18,461. About 7.7% of families and 9.7% of the population were below the poverty line, including 15.3% of those under age 18 and 4.2% of those age 65 or over.

== Communities and locations in the Town of Pulteney ==
- Brown Corners – A location in the north part of the town on County Road 78.
- Catawba – A hamlet in the southeast part of the town on NY-54A.
- Elmbois – A hamlet in the southwest part of the town on County Road 77.
- Gibson Landing – A hamlet on the shore of Keuka Lake and NY-54A.
- Glodes Corners – A location in the northwest part of the town on County Road 75.
- Lakeside Park – A hamlet on the shore of Keuka Lake, north of Gibson Landing on NY-54A.
- Pulteney – The hamlet of Pulteney in the northeast part of the town on County Road 76.
- South Pulteney – A hamlet southwest of Pulteney village.
- Stewarts Corners – A location in the northwest part of the town, south of Glodes Corners.
