= United States Post Office (Bath, New York) =

- US Post Office-Bath
- U.S. National Register of Historic Places
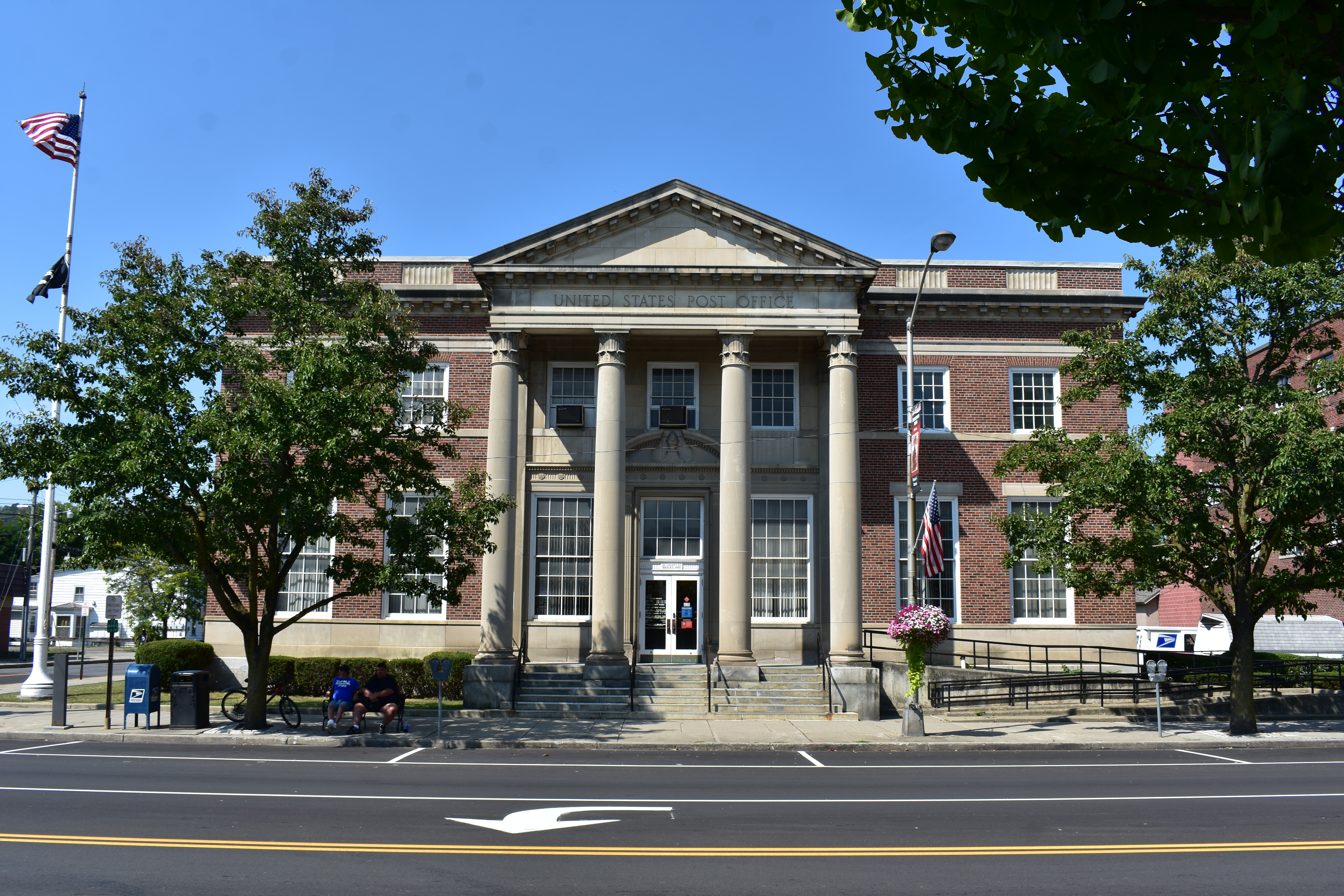
- The Bath Post Office from the east

- Location within New York Location within the United States
- Location: 101 Liberty St., Bath, New York
- Coordinates: 42°20′8″N 77°19′8″W
- Area: less than one acre
- Built: 1931
- Architect: Office of the Supervising Architect under James A. Wetmore
- Architectural style: Colonial Revival
- MPS: US Post Offices in New York State, 1858-1943, TR
- NRHP reference No.: 88002454
- Added to NRHP: November 17, 1988

US Post Office-Bath is a historic post office building located at Bath in Steuben County, New York. It was built in 1931 and is one of a number of post offices in New York State designed by the Office of the Supervising Architect under James A. Wetmore. It is a two-story symmetrically massed brick structure with a one-story rear wing in the Colonial Revival style. The front facade features a limestone pedimented portico supported by four Corinthian columns. It is located within the Liberty Street Historic District.

It was listed on the National Register of Historic Places in 1988.
