= Temple Beth-El (Hornell, New York) =

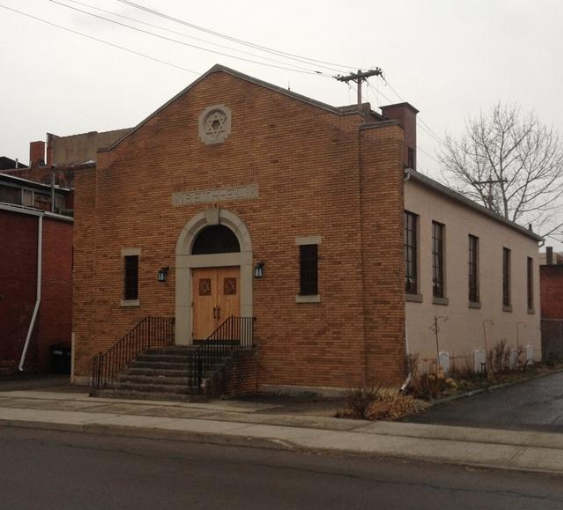

- Location in New York

Religion
- Affiliation: Orthodox Judaism (former)
- Ecclesiastical or organizational status: Synagogue
- Status: Closed (c. 2014)

Location
- Location: 12 Church Street, Hornell, New York
- Country: United States
- Interactive map of Temple Beth-El
- Coordinates: 42°09′25″N 77°47′45″W

Architecture
- Established: 1946 (as a congregation)
- Completed: 1946
- Temple Beth-El
- U.S. National Register of Historic Places
- Area: less than one acre
- NRHP reference No.: 16000021
- Added to NRHP: February 16, 2016

Temple Beth-El is a former Orthodox Jewish synagogue located at 12 Church Street, Hornell, New York, in the United States. Built in 1946, it was founded as an Orthodox congregation and, in the 1960s, operated briefly as a Conservative congregation.

In February 2016, the synagogue building was listed on the National Register of Historic Places.

== Architecture ==
The building reflects the pattern of Jewish settlement seen in small towns across New York in the mid-nineteenth and early twentieth centuries. The building illustrates the economic, social, and cultural impact this ethnic and religious group made to the community. Previous to the synagogue, the congregation worshiped in local homes and later the Erlich Hebrew Center, a Jewish center established in a downtown commercial building (converted into studios for WLEA after the Jewish community moved out).

After World War II, the center proved to be inadequate and the congregation pooled its resources. Renamed Temple Beth-El, the congregation was able to build its own house of worship near the center of the city where other religious houses of worship were prominently sited. Design and construction were guided by a building committee and the synagogue was dedicated in 1947. The only change made to the building since its dedication was a new roof and ceiling in the worship space in 1976. Prior to its closure, the presence of the synagogue reinforced the fact that the congregation was part of the Hornell community.

== History ==
In 1950 the Rabbi was Harry Zwick, and congregation officers were: president Isadore Spitulnik, vice-president Louis Eisenberg MD, financial secretary Joseph Cropp, recording secretary Edward Schulimson, treasurer Hyman Jacobsen.

Temple Beth-El was unable to support a full-time rabbi following Hornell's economic and demographic collapse after the closure of the Erie Railroad's repair shops, its main industry, in 1960. It operated briefly as a Conservative congregation. As of 2014, the synagogue was inactive.

In 2010 it was a target for graffiti, a red pentagon and the initials FBG sprayed on the side. In July 2022, after allegedly distributing pamphlets bearing hate symbols at the front of Temple Beth-El Synagogue and other places of worship, three people were charged with 115 counts of aggravated harassment. Following a four-day trial, one of the three were convicted by a jury on ten counts of first-degree aggravated harassment and nine counts of fourth-degree criminal mischief as a hate crime. The other two people pleaded guilty to the charges.

== See also ==
- National Register of Historic Places listings in Steuben County, New York
