= David Rumsey (politician) =

American politician

Member of the U.S. House of Representatives from New York's 30th district
- In office March 4, 1847 – March 3, 1851
- Preceded by: Martin Grove
- Succeeded by: Reuben Robie

Personal details
- Born: December 25, 1810 Salem, New York, U.S.
- Died: March 12, 1883 (aged 72) Steuben County, New York, U.S.
- Party: Whig

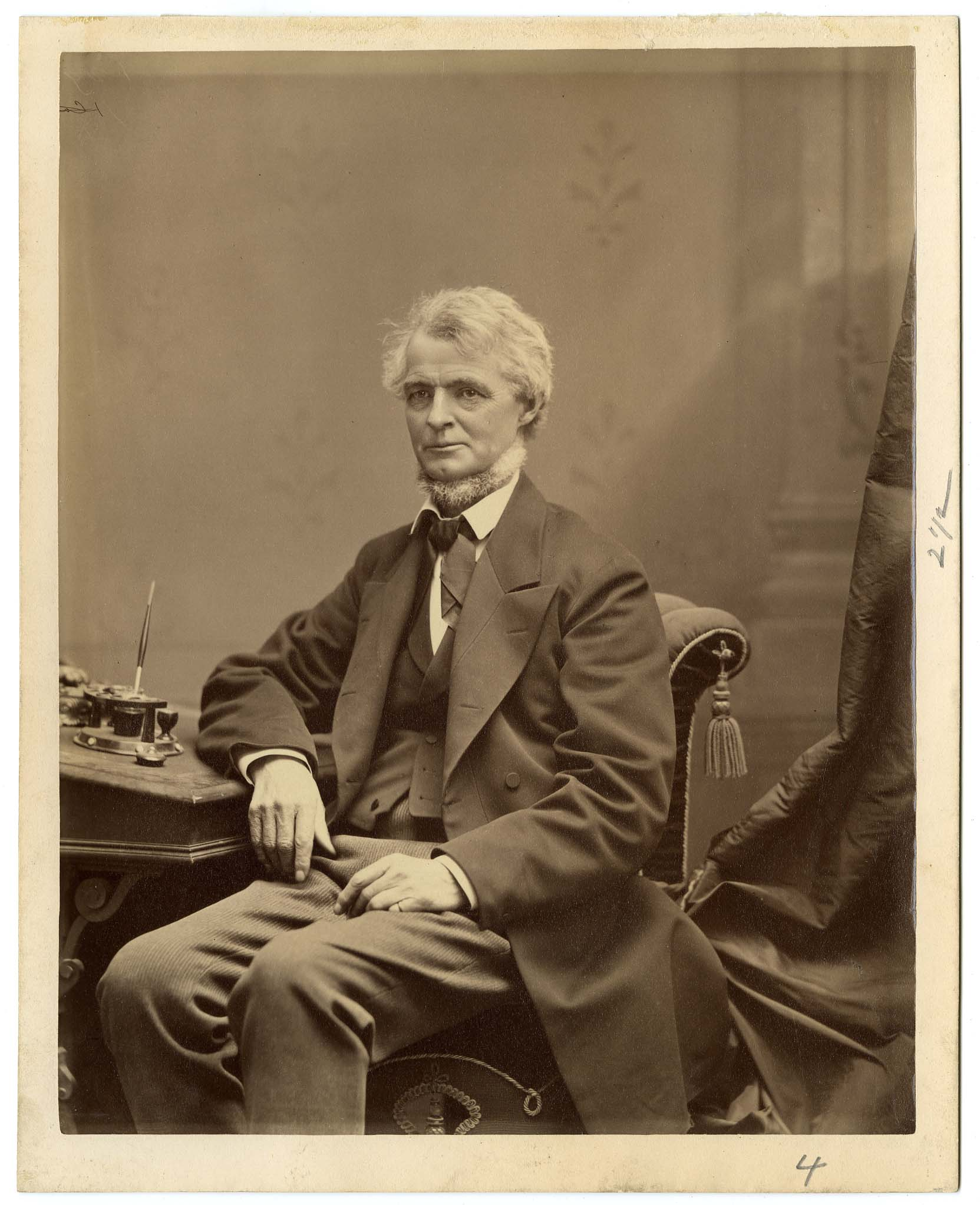
Hon. David Rumsey

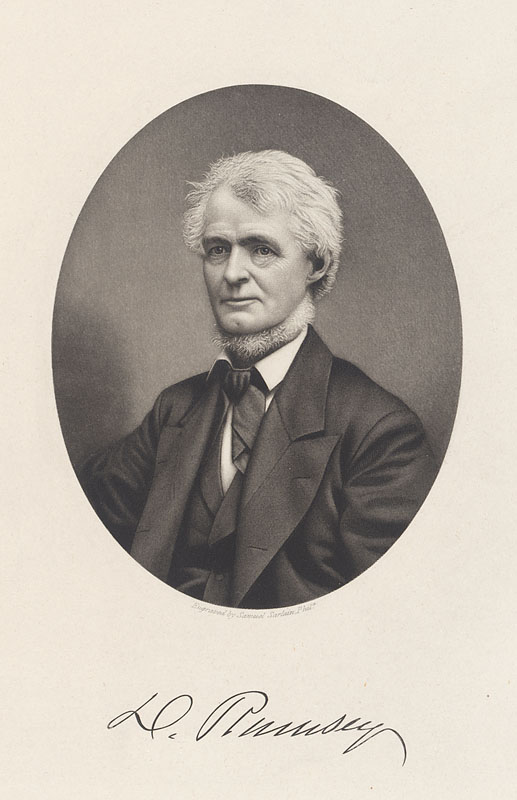
David Rumsey.

David Rumsey (December 25, 1810 – March 12, 1883) was a United States representative from New York. Born in Salem, Washington County, he attended school at Auburn and Geneva College (now Hobart College) at Geneva, New York. He studied law, was admitted to the bar in 1831 and commenced practice in Bath. He was surrogate of Steuben County from 1840 to 1844 and held many local offices.

Rumsey was elected as a Whig to the Thirtieth and Thirty-first Congresses, holding office from March 4, 1847, to March 3, 1851. He was a delegate to the New York constitutional convention in 1867 and was a member of the commission to propose amendments to the State constitution in 1872. In 1873 he appointed as an associate justice of the New York supreme court to fill a vacancy and was elected to the same office in the fall of that year. In 1883, Rumsey died in Bath; interment was in a private cemetery on the Rumsey place. His home at Bath, known as the Campbell-Rumsey House, was listed on the National Register of Historic Places in 1983.

U.S. House of Representatives
Preceded by Martin Grover	Member of the U.S. House of Representatives from New York's 30th congressional district 1847–1851	Succeeded by Reuben Robie
