= Reuben Robie =

American politician (1799–1872)

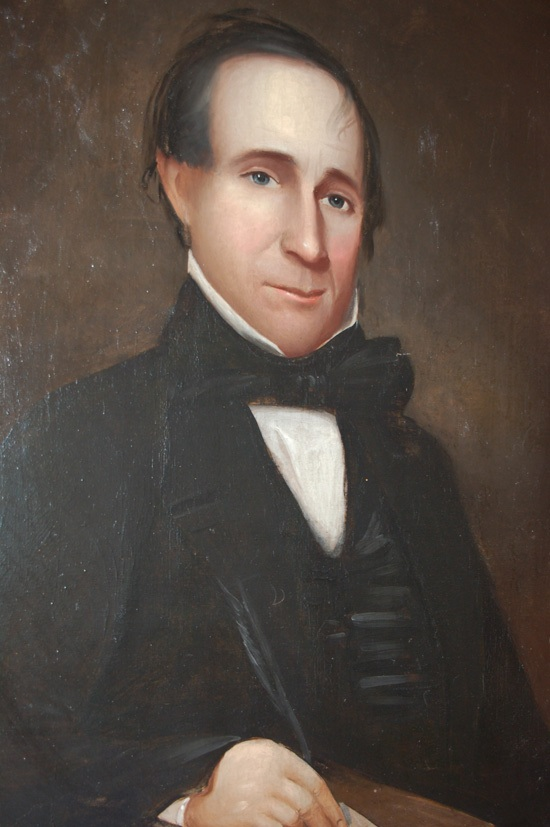

Member of the U.S. House of Representatives from New York's 30th district
- In office March 4, 1851 – March 3, 1853
- Preceded by: David Rumsey
- Succeeded by: Benjamin Pringle

Personal details
- Born: July 15, 1799 Corinth, Vermont, U.S.
- Died: January 21, 1872 (aged 72) Bath, New York, U.S.
- Resting place: Grove Cemetery
- Party: Democratic
- Occupation: Politician, businessman

Reuben Robie (July 15, 1799 – January 21, 1872) was an American businessman and politician who served one term as a U.S. representative from New York from 1851 to 1853.

== Biography ==
Born in Corinth, Vermont, Robie attended the common schools. At the age of twenty he moved to Bath, New York, and established a successful mercantile business. He later became active in other ventures, including the Buffalo, Corning and New York Railroad and the Steuben County Bank. Robie was also a founder of the Steuben County Agricultural Society.

He was active in the New York Militia, serving on the staff of the 56th Brigade in the 1830s.

=== Political career ===
Robie was active in local government, serving as Town Clerk from 1825 to 1830, and Town Supervisor in 1831 and 1832. In 1837 he was appointed Postmaster, and served four years. From 1844 to 1847 Robie served as Steuben County Treasurer.

==== Congress ====
In 1850 Robie was elected to the United States House as a Democrat. and he served in the Thirty-second Congress, March 4, 1851 to March 3, 1853. He was not a candidate for renomination in 1852.

=== Later career and death ===
After leaving Congress Robie resumed his business interests. He died in Bath on January 21, 1872 and was interred in Grove Cemetery.

His home at Bath, known as the Reuben Robie House, was listed on the National Register of Historic Places in 1983.

In 2011 Robie was added to the Steuben County Hall of Fame.

U.S. House of Representatives
Preceded by David Rumsey	Member of the U.S. House of Representatives from New York's 30th congressional district 1851–1853	Succeeded by Benjamin Pringle
