= Central Point (skyscraper) =

Skyscraper office building in Warsaw, Poland

- The Central Point as see from the Varso Tower.

General information
- Type: Skyscraper
- Location: 37 Zielna Street, Downtown, Warsaw, Masovian Voivodeship, Poland
- Coordinates: 52°14′07.5″N 21°00′26.9″E
- Construction started: 2019
- Completed: 2021

Height
- Architectural: 86 (282.15 ft)
- Roof: 70 (229.66 ft)

Technical details
- Floor count: 21
- Floor area: 19,100 m^{2} (205,590.69 sq ft)

Design and construction
- Architecture firm: Biuro Projektów Kazimierski i Ryba, Arquitectonica
- Developer: Immobel Poland
- Main contractor: Strabag

The Central Point, also known as the CBD One, is a skyscraper office building in the city of Warsaw in Masovian Voivodeship, Poland. It is located in the neighborhood of North Downtown, at 37 Zielna Street, at the corner of Marszałkowska and Świętokrzyska Streets. The building was opened in 2021. It measures 70 m (229.66 ft) from the base to the roof, with a total architectural height of 86 m (282.15 ft).

== History ==
The construction of the Central Point begun in April 2019, and the building was opened in November 2021. The building was designed by the architectural firms Biuro Projektów Kazimierski i Ryba and Arquitectonica, as an investment by Immobel Poland. It was constructed by Strabag. Since February 2022, the building is owned by Colliers company.

== Characteristics ==
Central Point is a skyscraper office located at 37 Zielna Street, at the corner of Marszałkowska and Świętokrzyska Streets. It measures 70 m (229.66 ft) from the base to the roof, with a total architectural height of 86 m (282.15 ft). The building has 21 storeys, and a total floor area of 19,100 m^{2} (205,590.69 sq ft), of which 18,000 m^{2} (193,750.39 ft) is used for office spaces, and 1,100 m^{2} (11,840.3 sq ft) for the shopping and services.
