= Liberty Street Historic District (Bath, New York) =

Historic district in New York, United States

- U.S. National Register of Historic Places
- U.S. Historic district
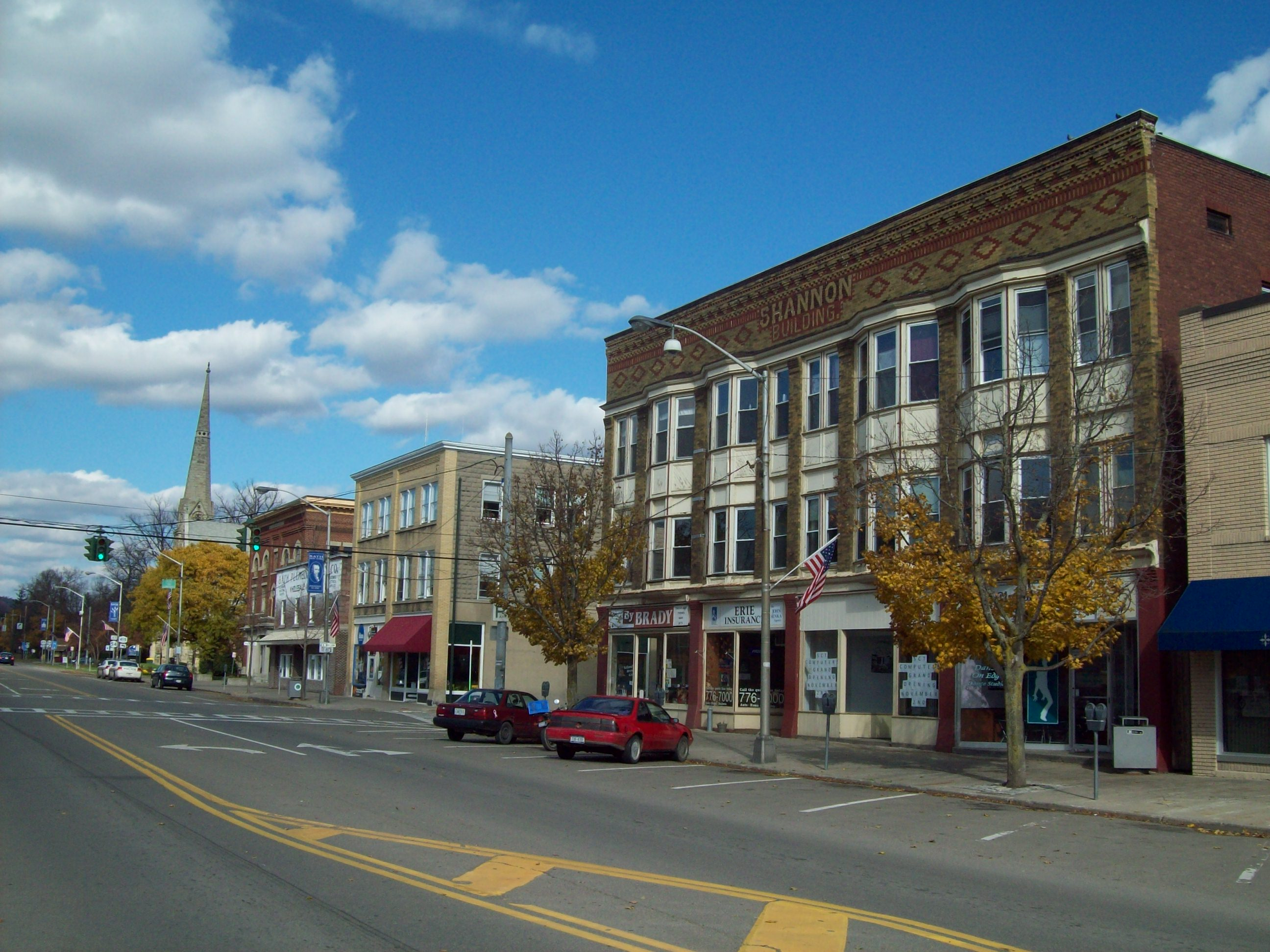
- Liberty Street Historic District, Bath, NY, October 2009

- Location within New York Location within the United States
- Location: Roughly Liberty St. from E. Morris St. to Haverling St., Bath, New York
- Coordinates: 42°20′6″N 77°19′8″W
- Built: 1819
- Architectural style: Mid 19th Century Revival, Late Victorian
- MPS: Bath Village MRA
- NRHP reference No.: 83001800
- Added to NRHP: September 30, 1983

Liberty Street Historic District is a national historic district located at Bath in Steuben County, New York. It contains 76 commercial, residential, ecclesiastical, and civic structures in the historic core of the village. The southern part of the district is centered on Pulteney Square, a three-acre village green containing landscaped gardens, walkways, benches, fountains and a gazebo. It was one of two village greens laid out in 1793. A broad range of building types, styles, and uses dating from about 1819 to 1930 characterize the district. It is covered in Bath Village MRA. See also US Post Offices in New York State,1858-1943, TR.

It was listed on the National Register of Historic Places in 1983.

== Gallery ==
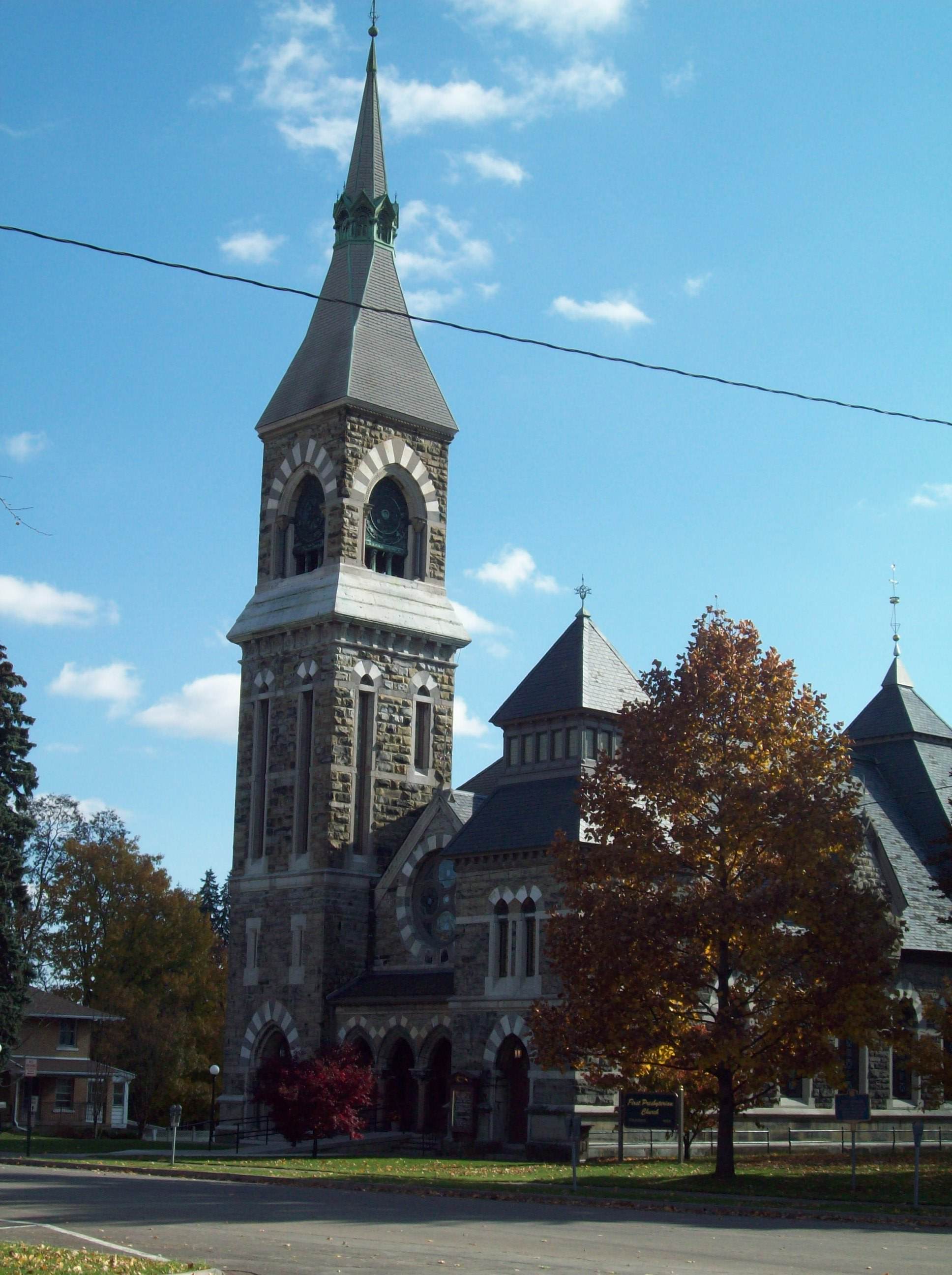
First Presbyterian Church, Bath NY, October 2009

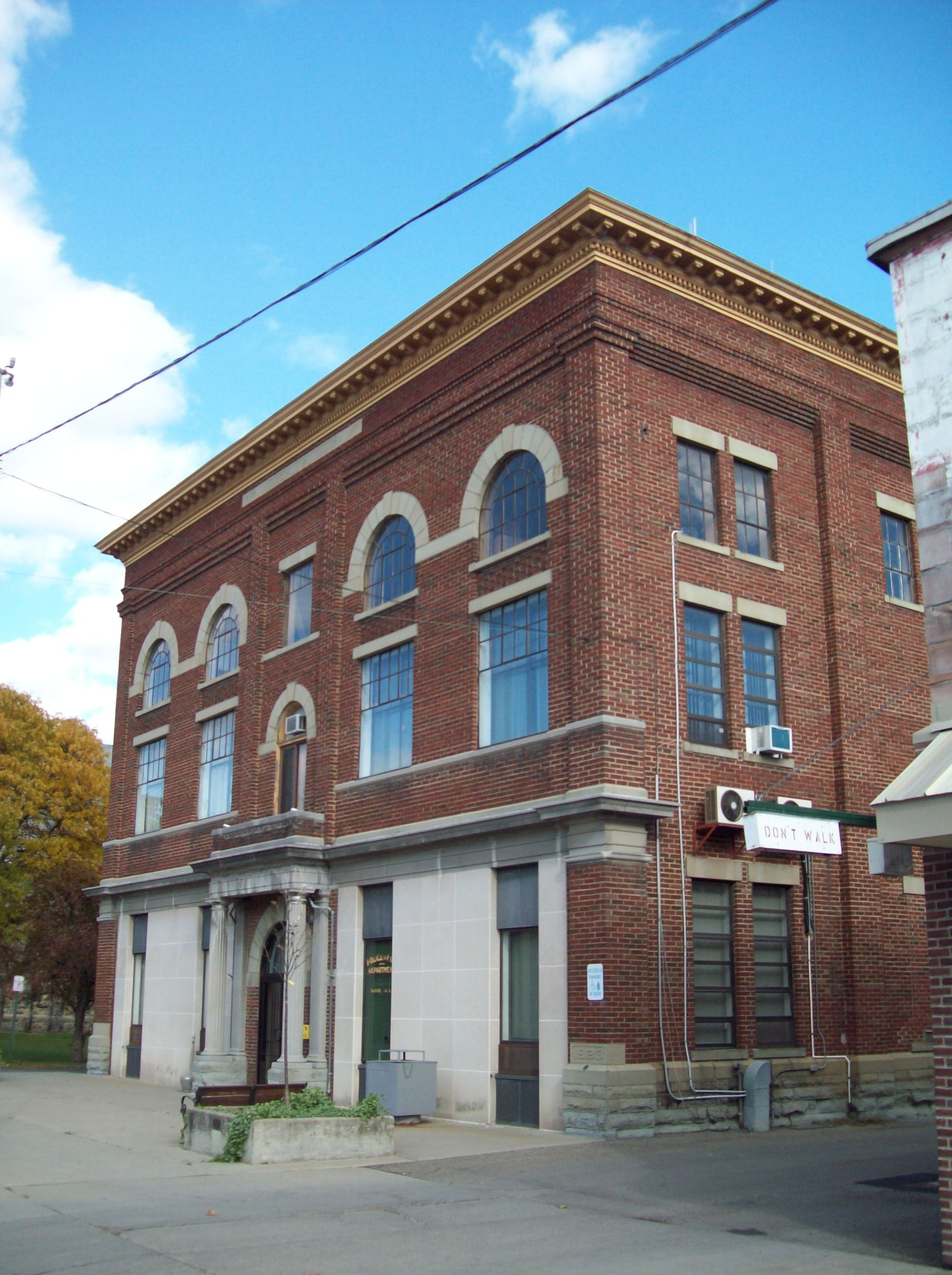
Municipal Building, Bath NY, October 2009

== See also ==
- National Register of Historic Places listings in Steuben County, New York
