= Erie Freighthouse Historic District =

Historic district in New York, United States

- U.S. National Register of Historic Places
- U.S. Historic district
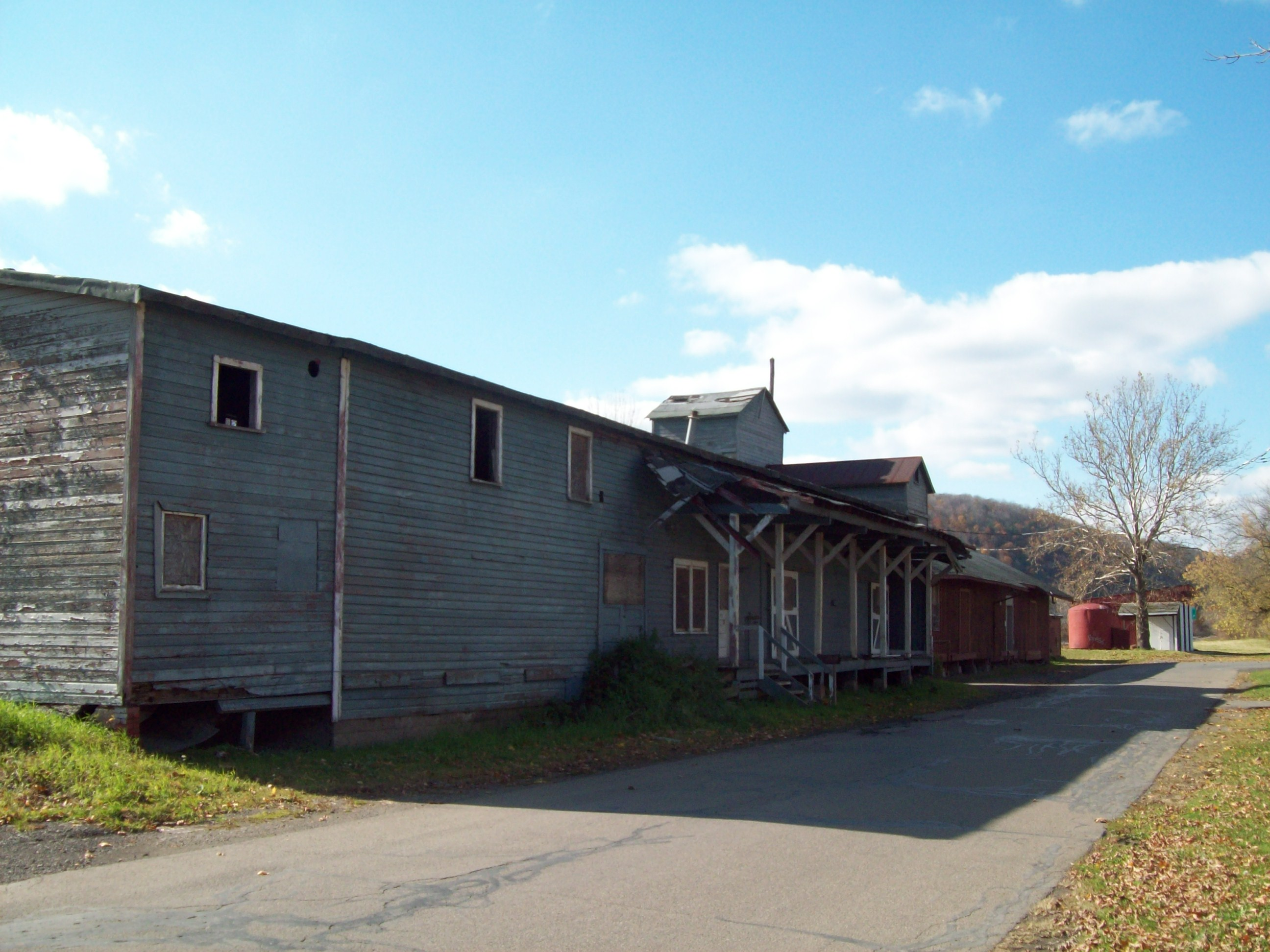
- Erie Freighthouse, October 2009

- Location within New York Location within the United States
- Location: Jct. of Cohocton St. and Railroad Ave., Bath, New York
- Coordinates: 42°20′0″N 77°19′34″W
- Area: 1.7 acres (0.69 ha)
- Architectural style: Late Victorian
- MPS: Bath Village MRA
- NRHP reference No.: 91000235
- Added to NRHP: March 18, 1991

Erie Freighthouse Historic District is a national historic district located at Bath in Steuben County, New York. It is composed of all or portions of seven properties (six contributing buildings), including the former Erie Railroad freighthouse, various buildings for the sale or storage of agricultural goods, and the former Bath Harnass Company factory.

It was listed on the National Register of Historic Places in 1991.
