= William Shepherd House =

Historic house in New York, United States

- U.S. National Register of Historic Places
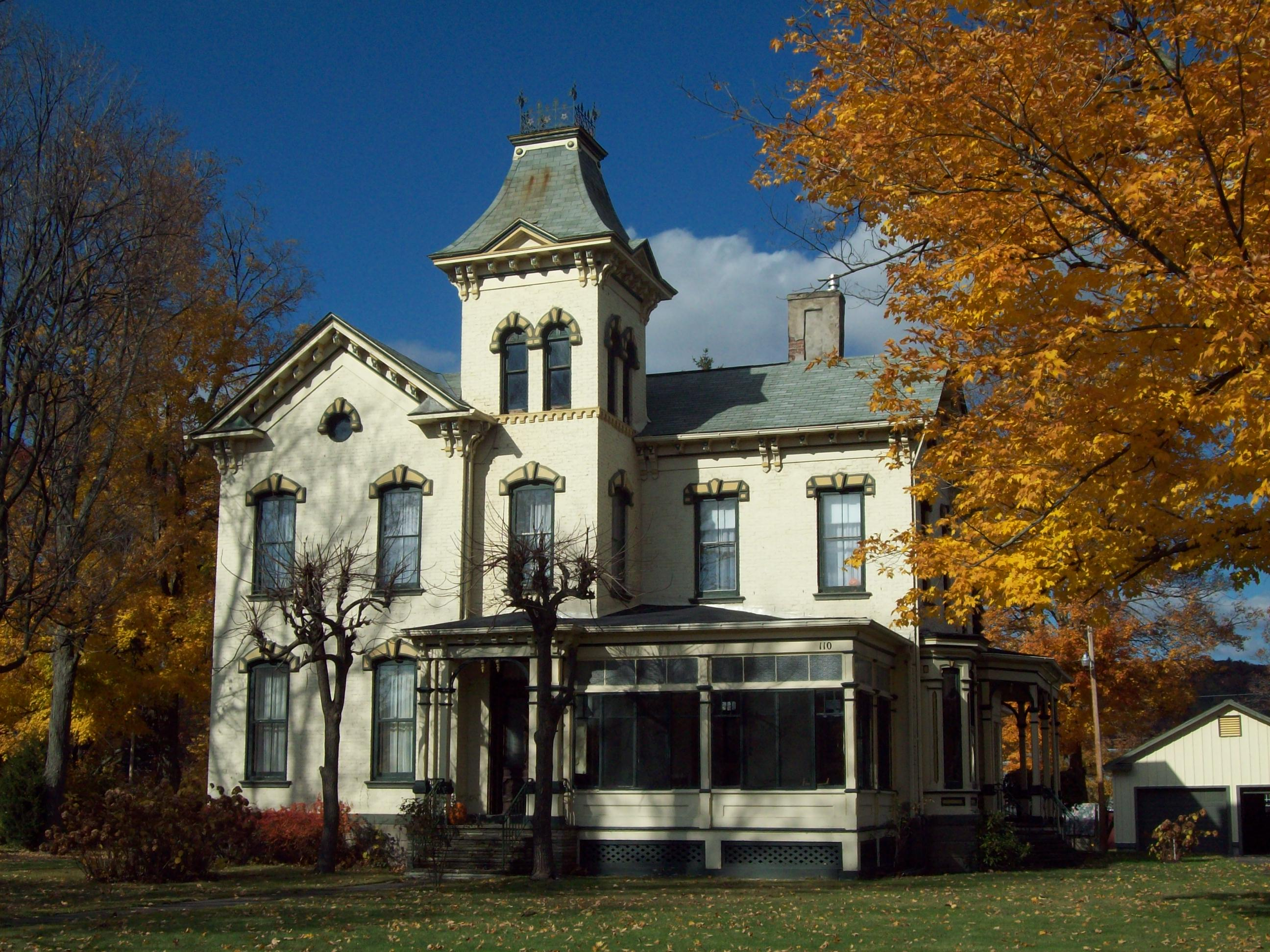
- William Shepherd House, October 2009

- Location within New York Location within the United States
- Location: 110 W. Washington St., Bath, New York
- Coordinates: 42°20′15″N 77°19′24″W
- Area: less than one acre
- Built: 1873
- Architectural style: Italian Villa
- MPS: Bath Village MRA
- NRHP reference No.: 83001805
- Added to NRHP: September 30, 1983

William Shepherd House is a historic home located at Bath in Steuben County, New York. It was built in 1873 and is a two-story Italian Villa style brick dwelling on a raised ashlar basement.

It was listed on the National Register of Historic Places in 1983.
