= McMaster House =

Historic house in New York, United States

- U.S. National Register of Historic Places
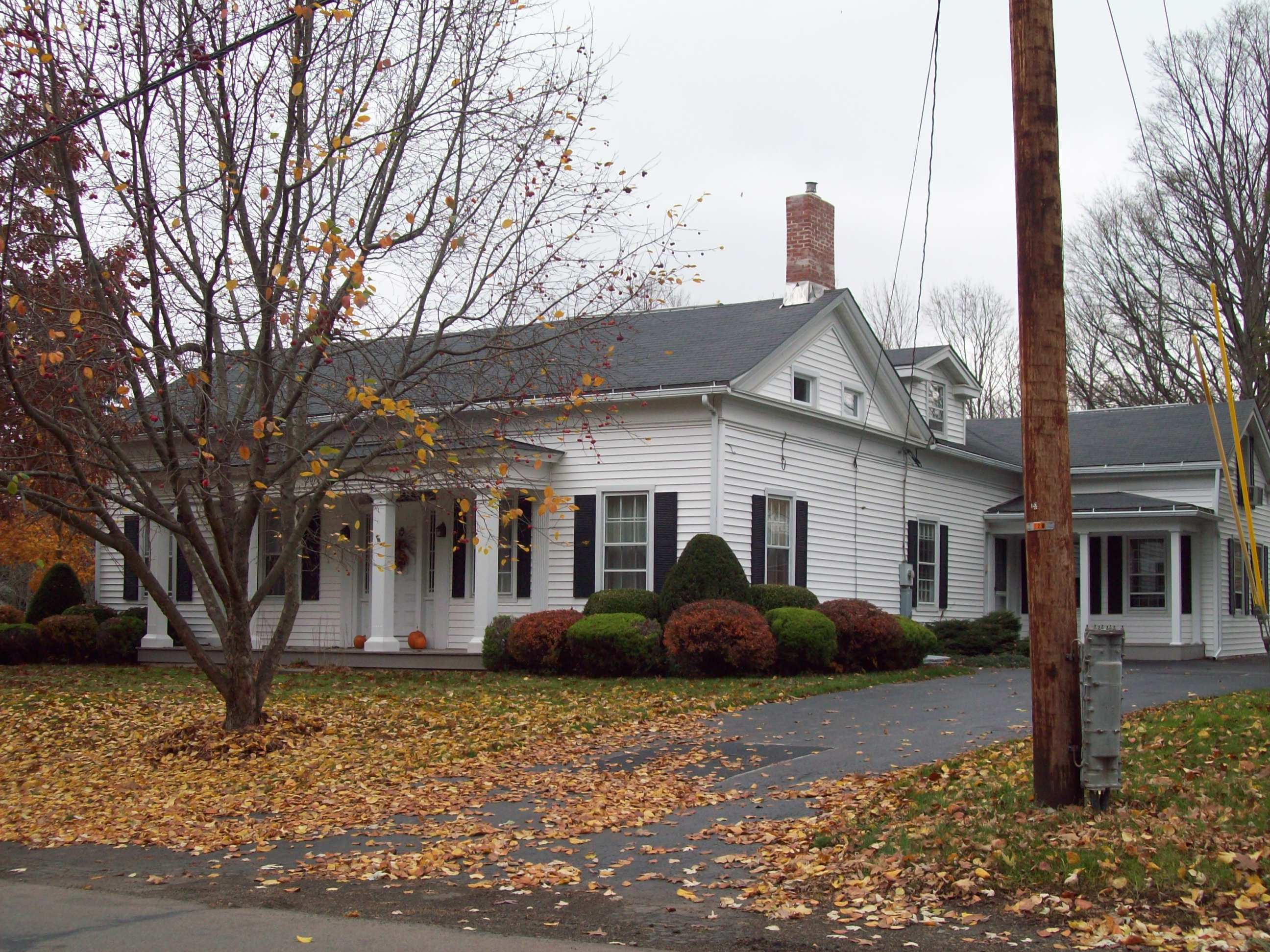
- McMaster House, October 2009

- Location within New York Location within the United States
- Location: 207 E. Washington St., Bath, New York
- Coordinates: 42°20′12″N 77°18′37″W
- Area: 0.8 acres (0.32 ha)
- Built: 1830
- Architectural style: Greek Revival, Vernacular Greek Revival
- MPS: Bath Village MRA
- NRHP reference No.: 83001801
- Added to NRHP: September 30, 1983

McMaster House is a historic home located at Bath in Steuben County, New York. It is a 1 1/2-story, five-bay frame residence built about 1830. It is a center-hall, vernacular Greek Revival-style farmhouse with a gable roof and brick interior end chimneys. Also on the property is a 1 1/2-story 19th-century barn.

It was listed on the National Register of Historic Places in 1983.
