= Gansevoort/East Steuben Streets Historic District =

Historic district in New York, United States

- U.S. National Register of Historic Places
- U.S. Historic district
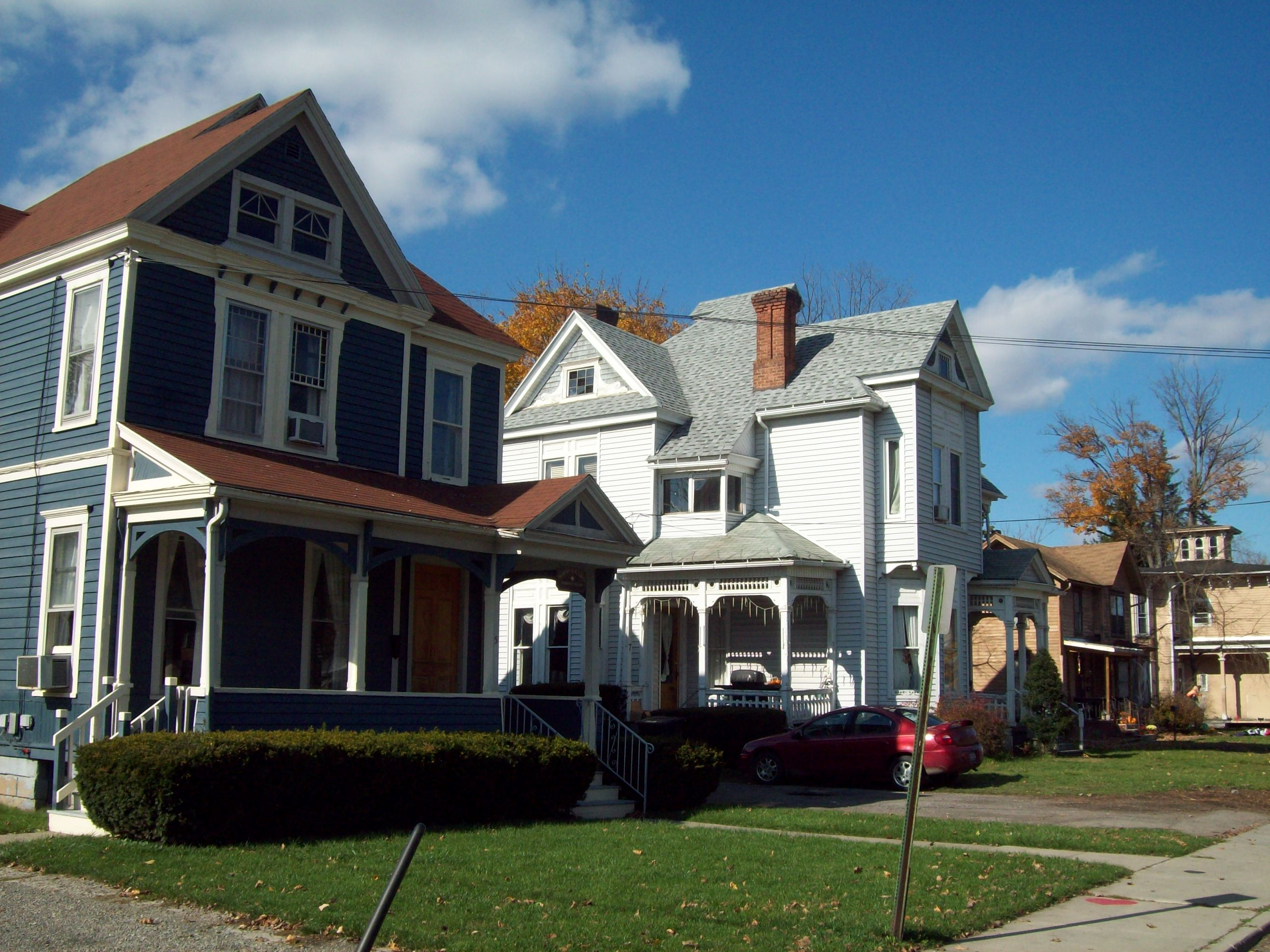
- Gansevoort/East Steuben Streets Historic District, October 2009

- Location within New York Location within the United States
- Location: E. Steuben and Gansevoort Sts., Bath, New York
- Coordinates: 42°20′1″N 77°18′54″W
- Area: 8 acres (3.2 ha)
- Built: 1830
- Architectural style: Greek Revival, Late Victorian
- MPS: Bath Village MRA
- NRHP reference No.: 83001798
- Added to NRHP: September 30, 1983

Gansevoort/East Steuben Streets Historic District is a national historic district located at Bath in Steuben County, New York. The district contains 22 residences dating from about 1830 to 1908 and designed in a broad range of architectural styles.

It was listed on the National Register of Historic Places in 1983.
