= James H. Bolton House =

Historic house in New York, United States

- U.S. National Register of Historic Places
- Location within New York Location within the United States
- Location: 117 W. Washington St., Bath, New York
- Coordinates: 42°20′13″N 77°19′34″W
- Area: less than one acre
- Built: 1909
- Architectural style: Queen Anne
- MPS: Bath Village MRA
- NRHP reference No.: 15000034
- Added to NRHP: February 23, 2015

The James H. Bolton House is a historic house located at 117 West Washington Street in Bath, Steuben County, New York

== Description and history ==
It was built in 1909, and is a 2 1/2-story, Queen Anne style frame dwelling. It is sheathed in clapboard and has a cross-gable roof with roof brackets and scalloped shingles on the gable ends. It features a broad porch with a square spindle balustrade between equally spaced rounded columns with Doric order capitals.

It was listed on the National Register of Historic Places on February 23, 2015.
