= The First Baptist Society of Bath =

Historic church in New York, United States

- U.S. National Register of Historic Places
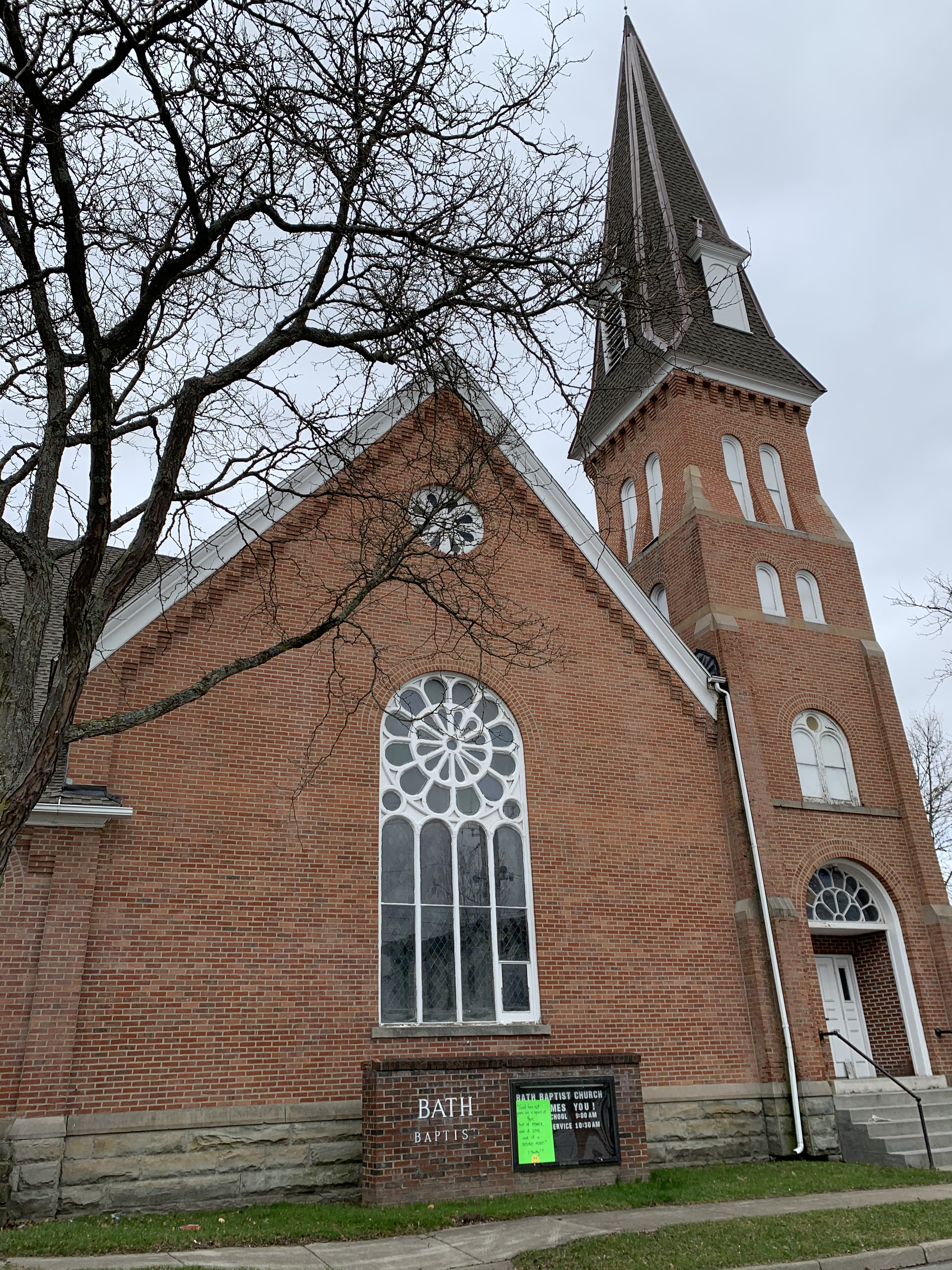

- Location within New York Location within the United States
- Location: 14 Howell St. Bath, New York
- Coordinates: 42°20′05″N 77°19′17″W
- Area: less than one acre
- Built: 1887-1888
- Built by: Thomas Fogarty; Lafayette Small
- Architect: Truman I. Lacey
- Architectural style: Romanesque
- MPS: Bath Village MRA
- NRHP reference No.: 13000372
- Added to NRHP: June 12, 2013

The First Baptist Society of Bath, also known as Bath Baptist Church, is a historic Baptist church located at Bath, Steuben County, New York. The church was built in 1887–1888, and is a cruciform plan, Romanesque Revival style brick and stone church. It has a steep cross-gable roof and square corner bell tower with a tall octagonal spire. The church features rounded windows and lintels. Attached to the church is a fellowship hall built in 1952 and expanded in 1981.

It was listed on the National Register of Historic Places in 2013.
