= Sedgwick House (Bath, New York) =

Historic house in New York, United States

- U.S. National Register of Historic Places
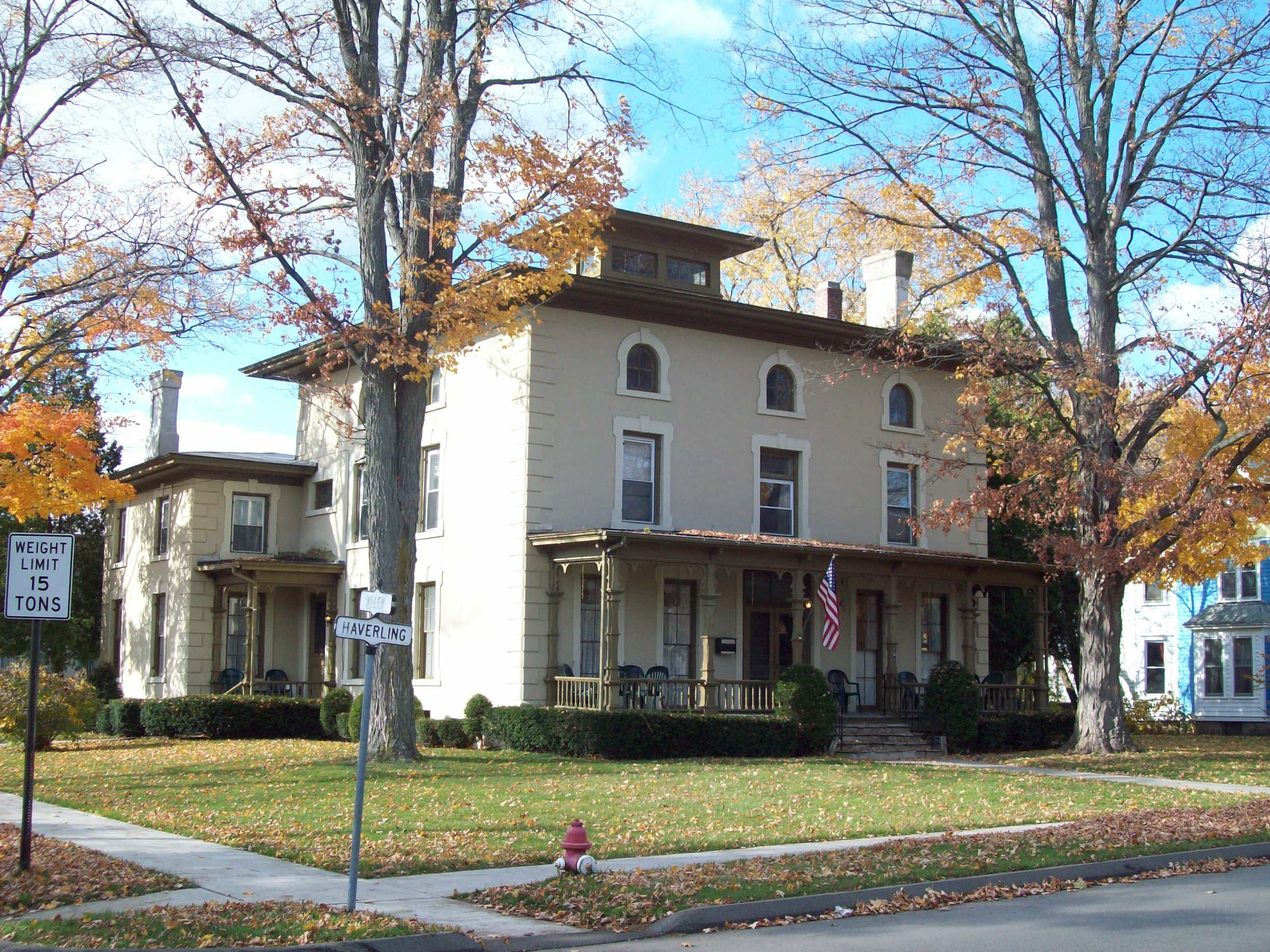
- Sedgwick House, October 2009

- Location within New York Location within the United States
- Location: 101 Haverling St., Bath, New York
- Coordinates: 42°20′27″N 77°19′6″W
- Area: less than one acre
- Built: 1840
- Architectural style: Italianate
- MPS: Bath Village MRA
- NRHP reference No.: 83001804
- Added to NRHP: September 30, 1983

Sedgwick House is a historic home located at Bath in Steuben County, New York. It was built between 1840 and 1854 and is a 2 1/2-story Italianate style brick dwelling coated with stucco. The low pitched hipped roof features a prominent cupola.

It was listed on the National Register of Historic Places in 1983.
