= Riverside, Steuben County, New York =

Riverside, New York
- Village
- Location within the state of New York
- Coordinates: 42°9′20″N 77°4′45″W
- Country: United States
- State: New York
- County: Steuben

Area
  - Total: 0.31 sq mi (0.80 km^{2})
  - Land: 0.30 sq mi (0.78 km^{2})
  - Water: 0.0039 sq mi (0.01 km^{2})
- Elevation: 938 ft (286 m)

Population (2020)
  - Total: 423
  - Density: 1,403.0/sq mi (541.72/km^{2})
- Time zone: UTC-5 (Eastern (EST))
  - Summer (DST): UTC-4 (EDT)
- FIPS code: 36-62061
- GNIS feature ID: 0962569

Riverside is a village in Steuben County, New York, United States. The population was 497 at the 2010 census. Riverside is situated in the town of Corning and is a western suburb of the city of Corning.

== History ==
In the latter part of the 19th century the nickname for the hamlet was Huckmuck due to flooding during periods of excessive rain. The William Erwin House was listed on the National Register of Historic Places in 1980 and delisted in 1985. The community was devastated in the 1972 "Hurricane Agnes" flood.

== Geography ==
Riverside is located at 42°9′20″N 77°4′45″W (42.155682, −77.079115).

According to the United States Census Bureau, the village has a total area of 0.3 square miles (0.78 km^{2}), of which 0.3 square miles (0.78 km^{2}) is land and 3.45% is water.

The village is north of the beginning of Chemung River, created by the confluence of the Cohocton and Tioga rivers. Cutler Creek enters the Chemung River by the village.

Riverside is located on New York State Route 415 adjacent to the Southern Tier Expressway.

== Demographics ==
Historical population
Census	Pop.	Note	%±
1930	671		—
1940	643		−4.2%
1950	818		27.2%
1960	1,030		25.9%
1970	911		−11.6%
1980	684		−24.9%
1990	585		−14.5%
2000	594		1.5%
2010	497		−16.3%
2020	423		−14.9%
U.S. Decennial Census

As of the census of 2000, there were 594 people, 227 households, and 162 families residing in the village. The population density was 2,095.7 inhabitants per square mile (809.2/km^{2}). There were 243 housing units at an average density of 857.3 per square mile (331.0/km^{2}). The racial makeup of the village was 96.63% White, 1.52% African American, 0.17% Asian, and 1.68% from two or more races. Hispanic or Latino of any race were 1.18% of the population.

There were 227 households, out of which 32.6% had children under the age of 18 living with them, 52.9% were married couples living together, 15.9% had a female householder with no husband present, and 28.6% were non-families. 22.9% of all households were made up of individuals, and 11.5% had someone living alone who was 65 years of age or older. The average household size was 2.62 and the average family size was 3.07.

In the village, the population was spread out, with 27.1% under the age of 18, 7.6% from 18 to 24, 25.8% from 25 to 44, 23.2% from 45 to 64, and 16.3% who were 65 years of age or older. The median age was 37 years. For every 100 females, there were 90.4 males. For every 100 females age 18 and over, there were 89.1 males.

The median income for a household in the village was $34,659, and the median income for a family was $39,712. Males had a median income of $31,875 versus $23,125 for females. The per capita income for the village was $17,697. About 13.2% of families and 12.0% of the population were below the poverty line, including 21.5% of those under age 18 and 1.8% of those age 65 or over.

== Education ==
It is in the Corning City School District.
