= Cobblestone House (Bath, New York) =

Historic house in New York, United States

- U.S. National Register of Historic Places
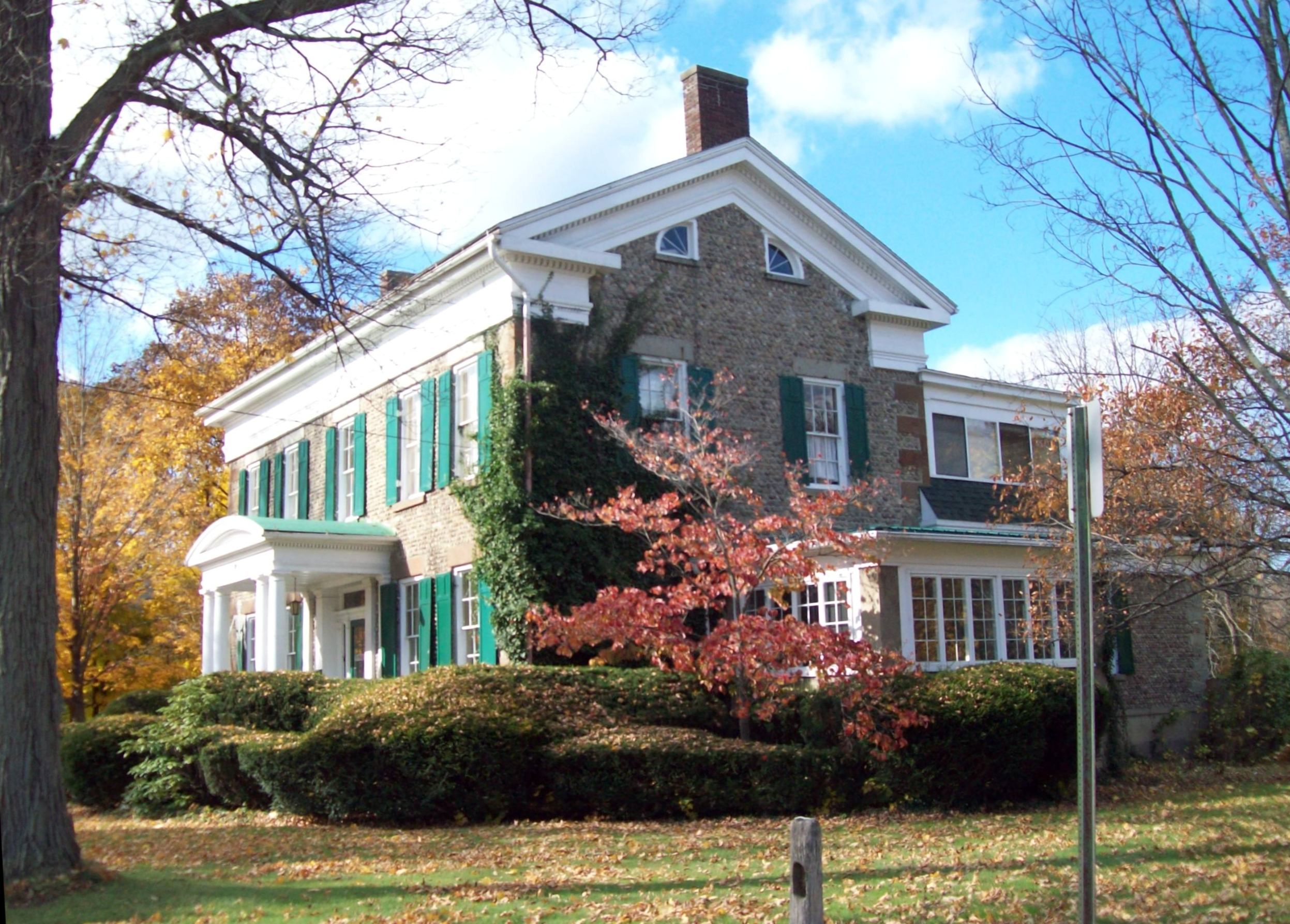
- Cobblestone House in October 2009

- Location within New York Location within the United States
- Location: 120 W. Washington St., Bath, New York
- Coordinates: 42°20′15″N 77°19′28″W
- Area: 1.7 acres (0.69 ha)
- Built: 1851
- Architect: Wellington Salt
- Architectural style: Greek Revival
- MPS: Bath Village MRA
- NRHP reference No.: 83001796
- Added to NRHP: September 30, 1983

Cobblestone House is a historic home located at Bath in Steuben County, New York. It is a cobblestone building built in the Greek Revival style in 1851.

It was listed on the National Register of Historic Places in 1983.
