= Campbell-Rumsey House =

Historic house in New York, United States

- U.S. National Register of Historic Places
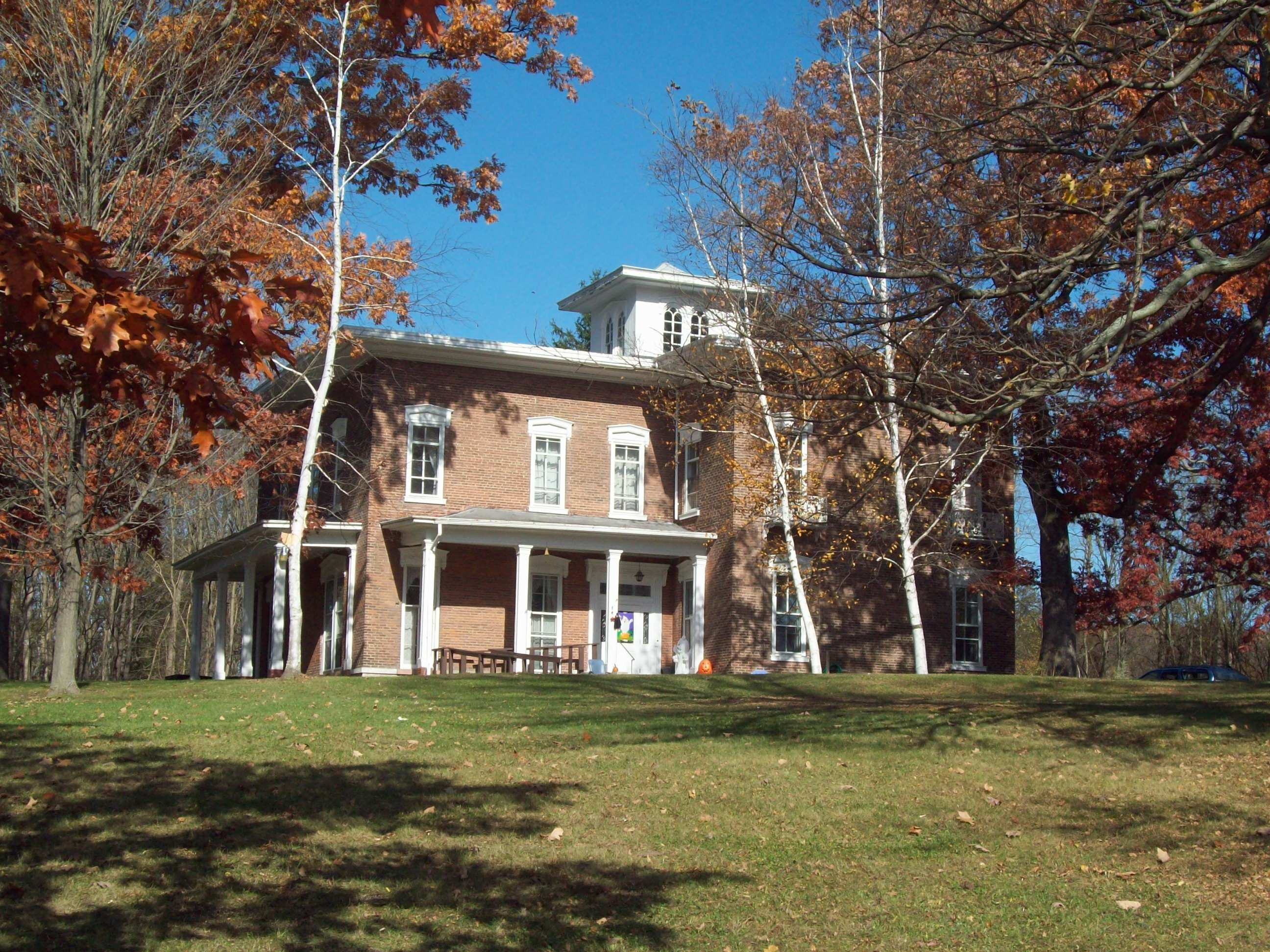
- Campbell-Rumsey House, October 2009

- Location within New York Location within the United States
- Location: 225 E. Steuben St., Bath, New York
- Coordinates: 42°19′58″N 77°18′27″W
- Area: 6.4 acres (2.6 ha)
- Built: 1855
- Architectural style: Italianate
- MPS: Bath Village MRA
- NRHP reference No.: 83001795
- Added to NRHP: September 30, 1983

Campbell-Rumsey House is a historic home located at Bath in Steuben County, New York. It was built about 1855 and is a two-story, Italianate style brick residence. It was home to two prominent Bath residents, Robert Campbell (1808–1870) and David Rumsey (1810–1883).

It was listed on the National Register of Historic Places in 1983.
