= Western New York Wine Company =

- U.S. National Register of Historic Places
- Location within New York Location within the United States
- Location: 9683 Middle Rd., Pulteney, New York
- Coordinates: 42°28′16″N 77°10′52″W
- Area: 26.22 acres (10.61 ha)
- Built: c. 1880, 1886, 1890
- Built by: Alonzo Speers
- NRHP reference No.: 14000585
- Added to NRHP: September 10, 2014

Western New York Wine Company, also known as the Philip Argus House and Winery, is a historic winery located at Pulteney, Steuben County, New York. The main building consists of a home and winery building built in 1886 and 1890, respectively. The buildings were connected in the 1970s. It is a two-story, L-shaped, fieldstone dwelling with an attached three-story, fieldstone winery. Both elements have cross-gable roofs. Also on the property is a contributing English barn built about 1880. The winery remains in operation as Chateau Frank.

It was listed on the National Register of Historic Places in 2014.
