= Reuben Robie House =

Historic house in New York, United States

- U.S. National Register of Historic Places
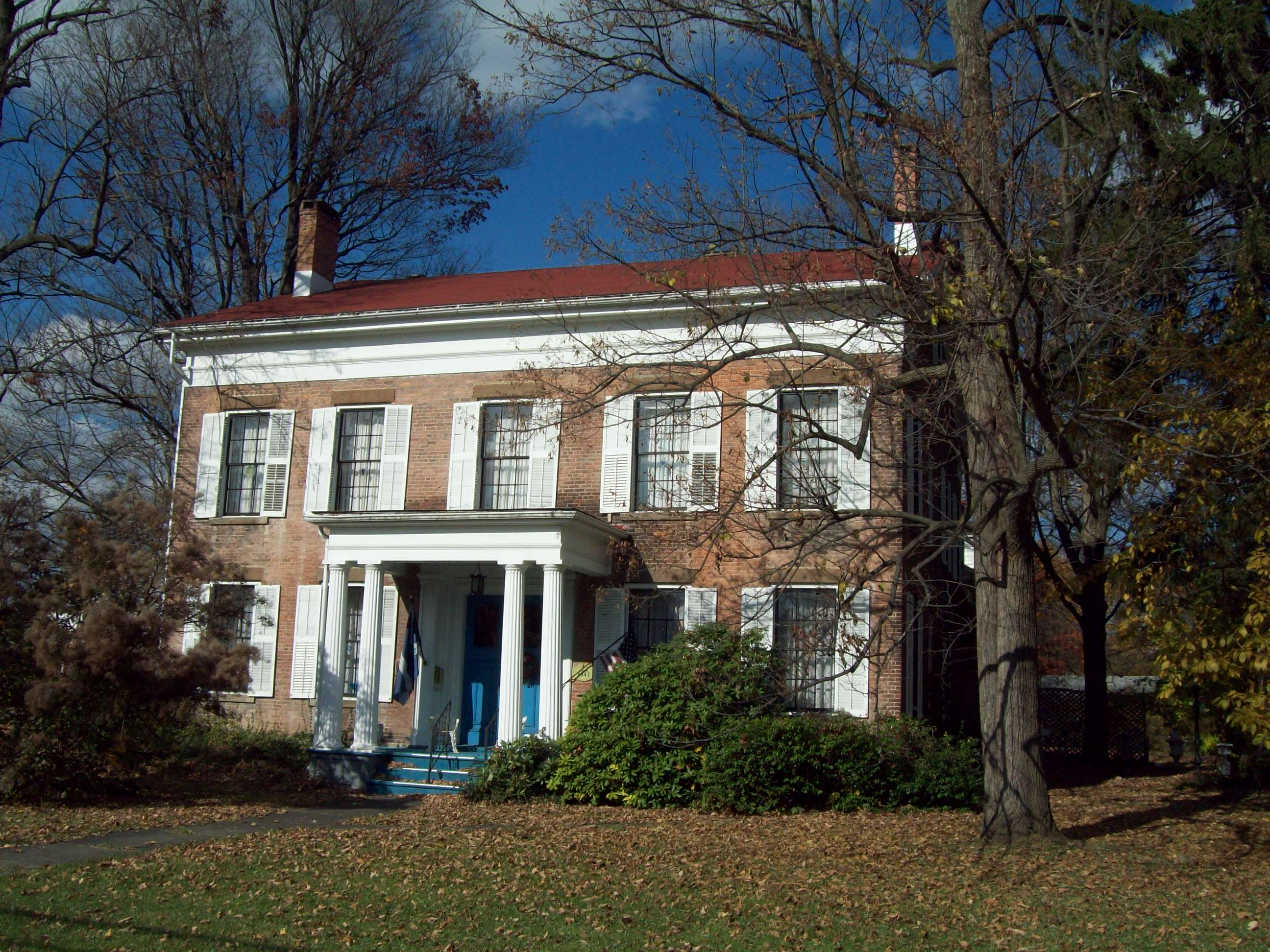
- Reuben Robie House, October 2009

- Location within New York Location within the United States
- Location: 16 W. Washington St., Bath, New York
- Coordinates: 42°20′15″N 77°19′17″W
- Area: 2.8 acres (1.1 ha)
- Built: 1847
- Architectural style: Greek Revival
- MPS: Bath Village MRA
- NRHP reference No.: 83001803
- Added to NRHP: September 30, 1983

Reuben Robie House is a historic home located at Bath in Steuben County, New York. It was built by Reuben Robie in 1847 and is a 2-story, center-hall Greek Revival–style brick dwelling. The small flat-roofed entrance portico supported by Doric columns was added about 1900. Also on the property is a 1 1/2-story board-and-batten carriage house and a toolshed. It was home to Congressman Reuben Robie (1799–1872).

It was listed on the National Register of Historic Places in 1983.
