= George W. Hallock House =

Historic house in New York, United States

- U.S. National Register of Historic Places
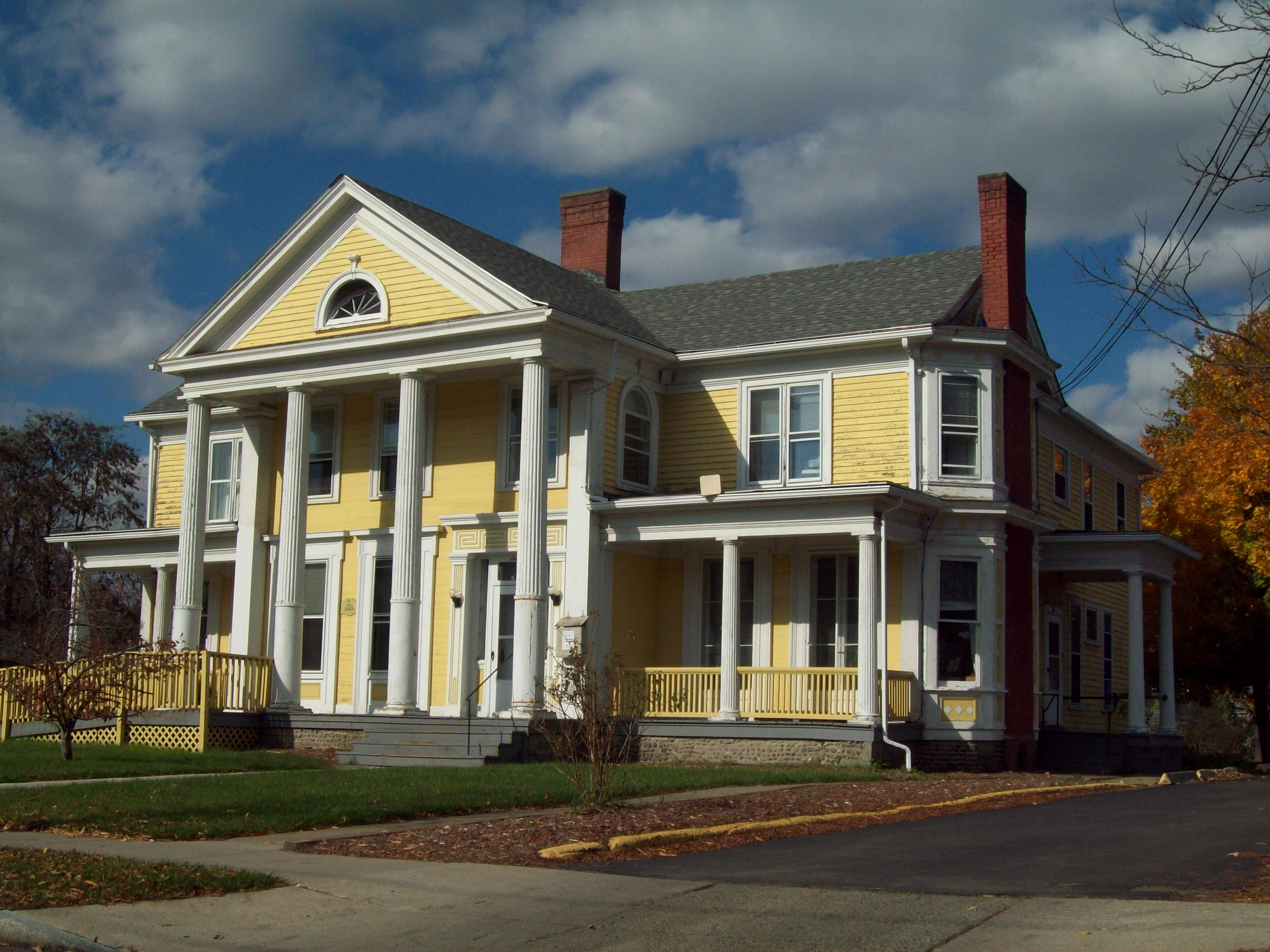
- George W. Hallock House, October 2009

- Location within New York Location within the United States
- Location: 16 W. William St., Bath, New York
- Coordinates: 42°20′15″N 77°19′14″W
- Area: less than one acre
- Built: 1847
- Architectural style: Greek Revival, Colonial Revival
- MPS: Bath Village MRA
- NRHP reference No.: 04001052
- Added to NRHP: September 24, 2004

George W. Hallock House, also known as The Pillars, is a historic home located at Bath in Steuben County, New York. It was built in about 1847 in the Greek Revival style. Later additions and remodeling in the early 20th century added Colonial Revival elements. Built for prominent local resident and banker George W. Hallock, it was also home to his father-in-law Congressman William Spring Hubbell (1801–1873). It currently serves as home to Legal Assistance of Western New York, Inc.®.

It was listed on the National Register of Historic Places in 2004.
