= Haverling Farm House =

Historic house in New York, United States

- U.S. National Register of Historic Places
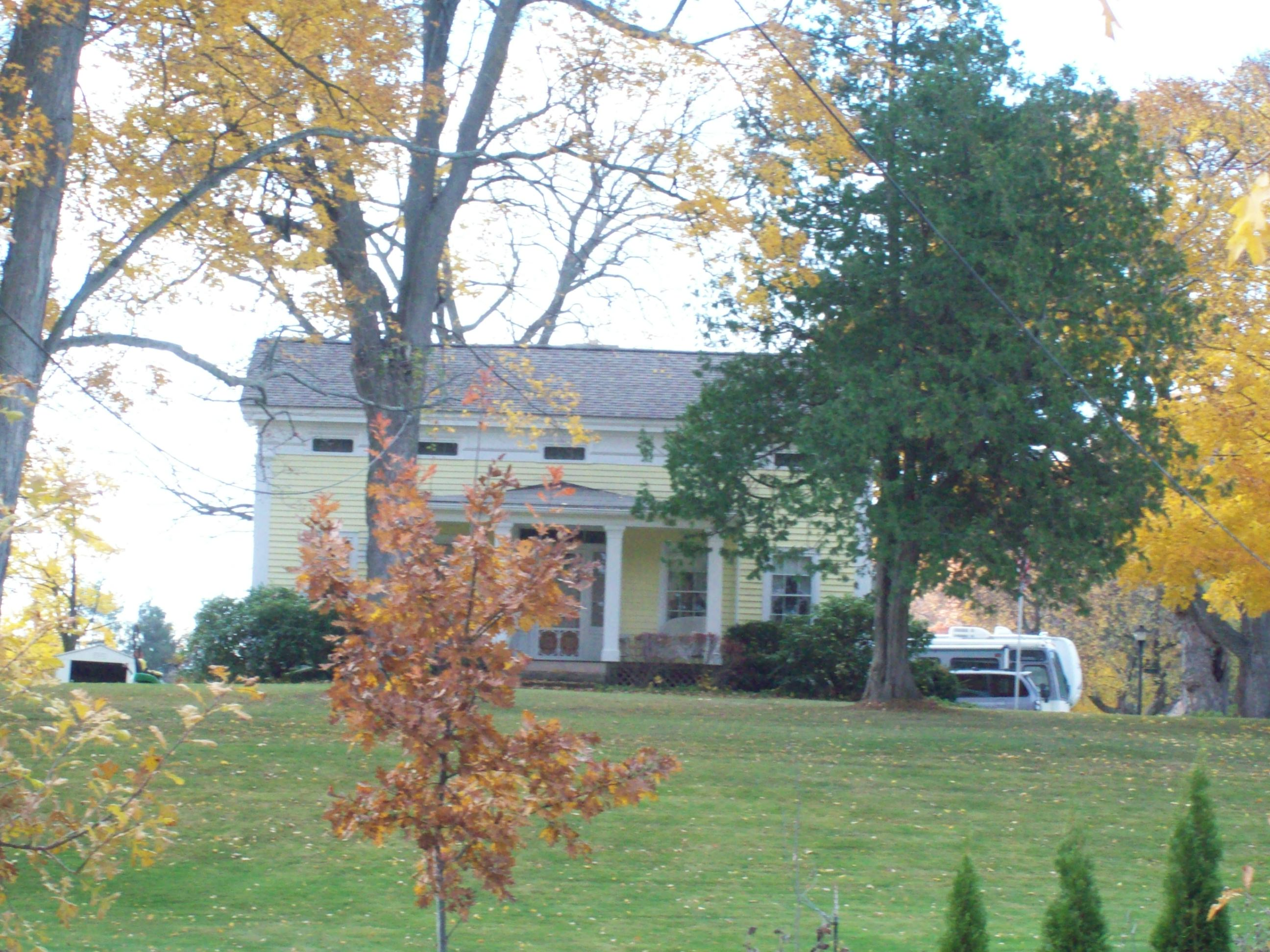
- Haverling Farm House, October 2009

- Location within New York Location within the United States
- Location: 313 Haverling St., Bath, New York
- Coordinates: 42°20′42″N 77°19′6″W
- Area: 0.5 acres (0.20 ha)
- Built: 1838
- Architectural style: Greek Revival
- MPS: Bath Village MRA
- NRHP reference No.: 83001799
- Added to NRHP: September 30, 1983

Haverling Farm House is a historic home located at Bath in Steuben County, New York. It is a 1 1/2-story, five-bay frame residence built about 1838. It is a center-hall, Greek Revival-style farmhouse with a gable roof.

It was listed on the National Register of Historic Places in 1983.
