= M. J. Ward Feed Mill Complex =

- U.S. National Register of Historic Places
- U.S. Historic district
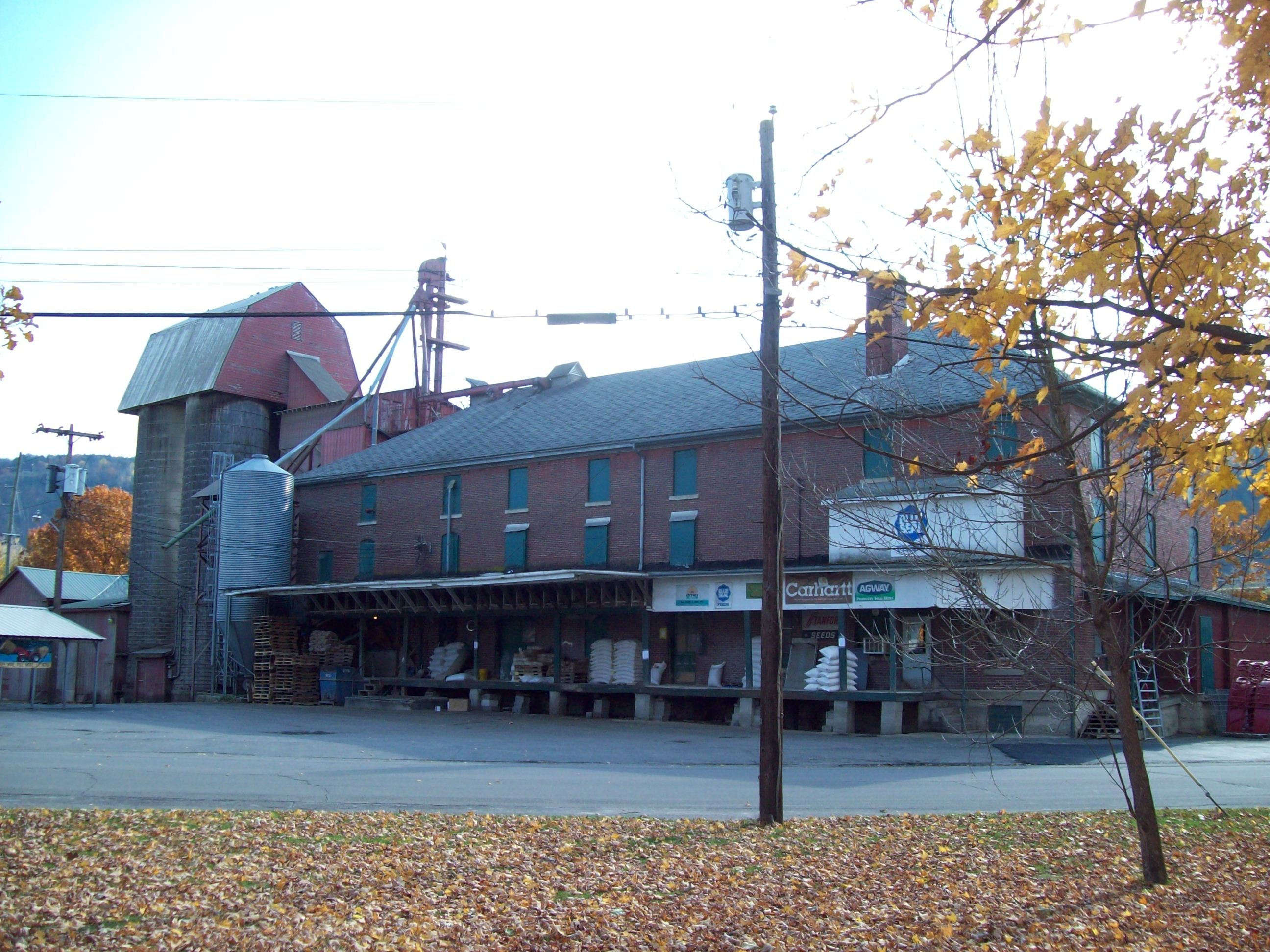
- M. J. Ward Feed Mill Complex, October 2009

- Location within New York Location within the United States
- Location: 1-9 Cameron St., Bath, New York
- Coordinates: 42°19′57″N 77°19′24″W
- Area: less than one acre
- Built: 1909
- Architectural style: Italianate
- MPS: Bath Village MRA
- NRHP reference No.: 91000236
- Added to NRHP: March 18, 1991

M. J. Ward Feed Mill Complex is a national historic district located at Bath in Steuben County, New York. The district is a single property containing a three-story feed mill and store (1909) with attached grain handling and storage facilities (1976), a storage barn (ca 1870), and a residence (ca. 1870).

It was listed on the National Register of Historic Places in 1991.
