= Potter-Van Camp House =

Historic house in New York, United States

- U.S. National Register of Historic Places
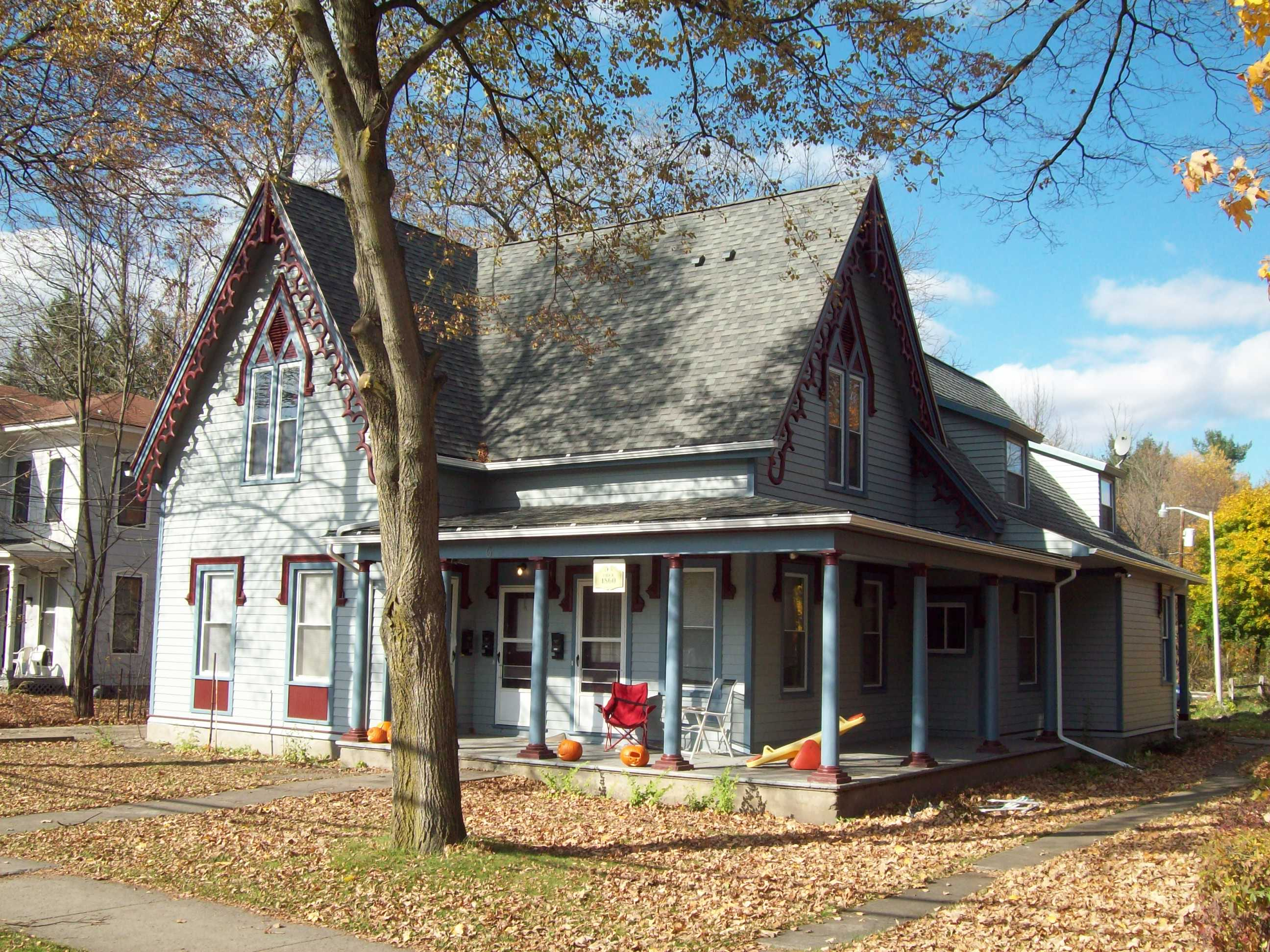
- Potter-Van Camp House, October 2009

- Location within New York Location within the United States
- Location: 4 W. Washington St., Bath, New York
- Coordinates: 42°20′14″N 77°19′11″W
- Area: less than one acre
- Built: 1845
- Architectural style: Gothic Revival
- MPS: Bath Village MRA
- NRHP reference No.: 83001802
- Added to NRHP: September 30, 1983

Potter-Van Camp House is a historic home located at Bath in Steuben County, New York. It was built about 1845–1850 and is a 1 1/2-story, Gothic Revival–style frame cottage.

It was listed on the National Register of Historic Places in 1983.
