= William Erwin House =

Historic house in New York, United States

- Formerly listed on the U.S. National Register of Historic Places
- Location: 508 Water St., Riverside, New York
- Area: 0.5 acres (0.20 ha)
- Built: 1850-1852
- Architectural style: Greek Revival
- NRHP reference No.: 80002774

Significant dates
- Added to NRHP: April 11, 1980
- Removed from NRHP: October 24, 1985

William Erwin House, also known as the Imperial Club, was a historic home located at Riverside, Steuben County, New York. It was built between 1850 and 1852, and was a two-story, Greek Revival style brick dwelling. It was a triple-front, temple form building with three major porticoes supported by four four fluted Corinthian order columns. It had two projecting rear wings that formed a "U", that was filled in around 1914. In 1914, the house was acquired by Ingersoll Rand and converted to a recreation center. The house suffered damage due to flooding from Hurricane Agnes in 1972. The house was destroyed by fire in 1982 after being struck by lightning.

It was listed on the National Register of Historic Places in 1980 and delisted in 1985.
