= Davenport Library (Bath, New York) =

- U.S. National Register of Historic Places
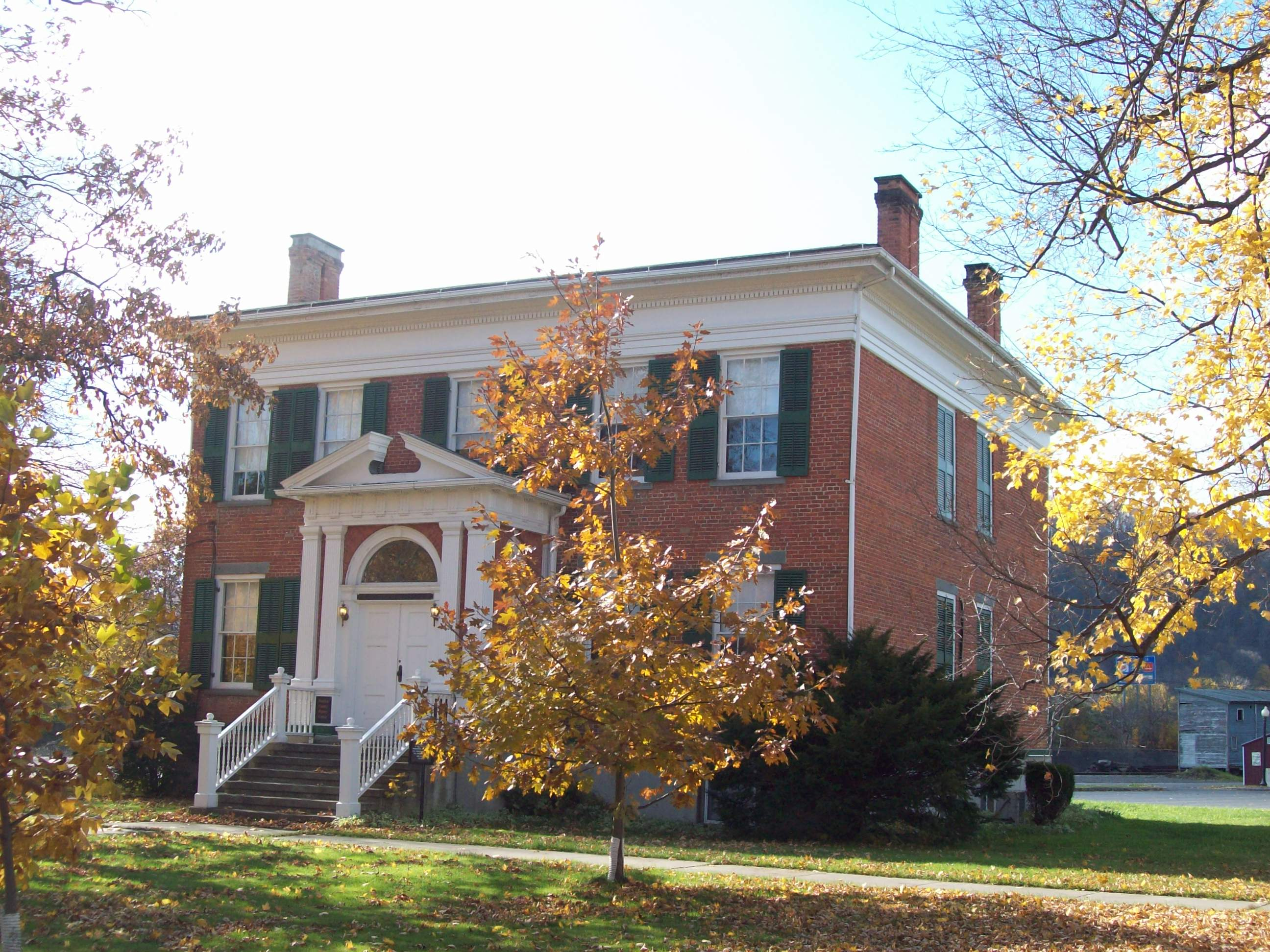
- Davenport Library, October 2009

- Location within New York Location within the United States
- Location: W. Morris St., Bath, New York
- Coordinates: 42°19′58″N 77°19′28″W
- Area: 2.5 acres (1.0 ha)
- Built: 1830
- Architectural style: Colonial Revival, Greek Revival
- MPS: Bath Village MRA
- NRHP reference No.: 83001797
- Added to NRHP: September 30, 1983

Davenport Library is a historic home located at Bath in Steuben County, New York. It is a two-story brick structure built about 1830 in the Greek Revival style. The building was altered sometime between 1893 and 1915 after it became a library. It was at this time that Colonial Revival details were added. With creation of a new library on the same campus in 1999, the structure was renamed Magee House after the original builder and owner, US Representative John Magee. It is now home to the Steuben County Historical Society and the Steuben County Historian's office.

It was listed on the National Register of Historic Places in 1983.
