= Cottages at Central Point =

Historic houses in New York, United States

- U.S. National Register of Historic Places
- Location within New York Location within the United States
- Location: 14681–14697 Keuka Village Rd., Wayne, New York
- Coordinates: 42°30′01″N 77°06′45″W
- Area: 0.46 acres (0.19 ha)
- Built: late 1880s
- Built by: Potter, Jephtha A.
- Architectural style: Victorian
- NRHP reference No.: 11000754
- Added to NRHP: October 20, 2011

Cottages at Central Point are a set of four historic cottages located on the east shore of Keuka Lake in Wayne in Steuben County, New York. They were built in the late 1880s, and are two-story, wood-frame cottages with steep gable roofs and wide porches. The cottages feature eclectic Victorian stylistic elements including board-and-batten siding, decorative stick work and brackets, wrap around porches, and decorative balusters. The cottages are known as "Sans Souci," "Marjean Lodge," "Villula," and "Ultimatum."

They were listed on the National Register of Historic Places in 2011.
