= Bath (village), New York =

Bath
- Village
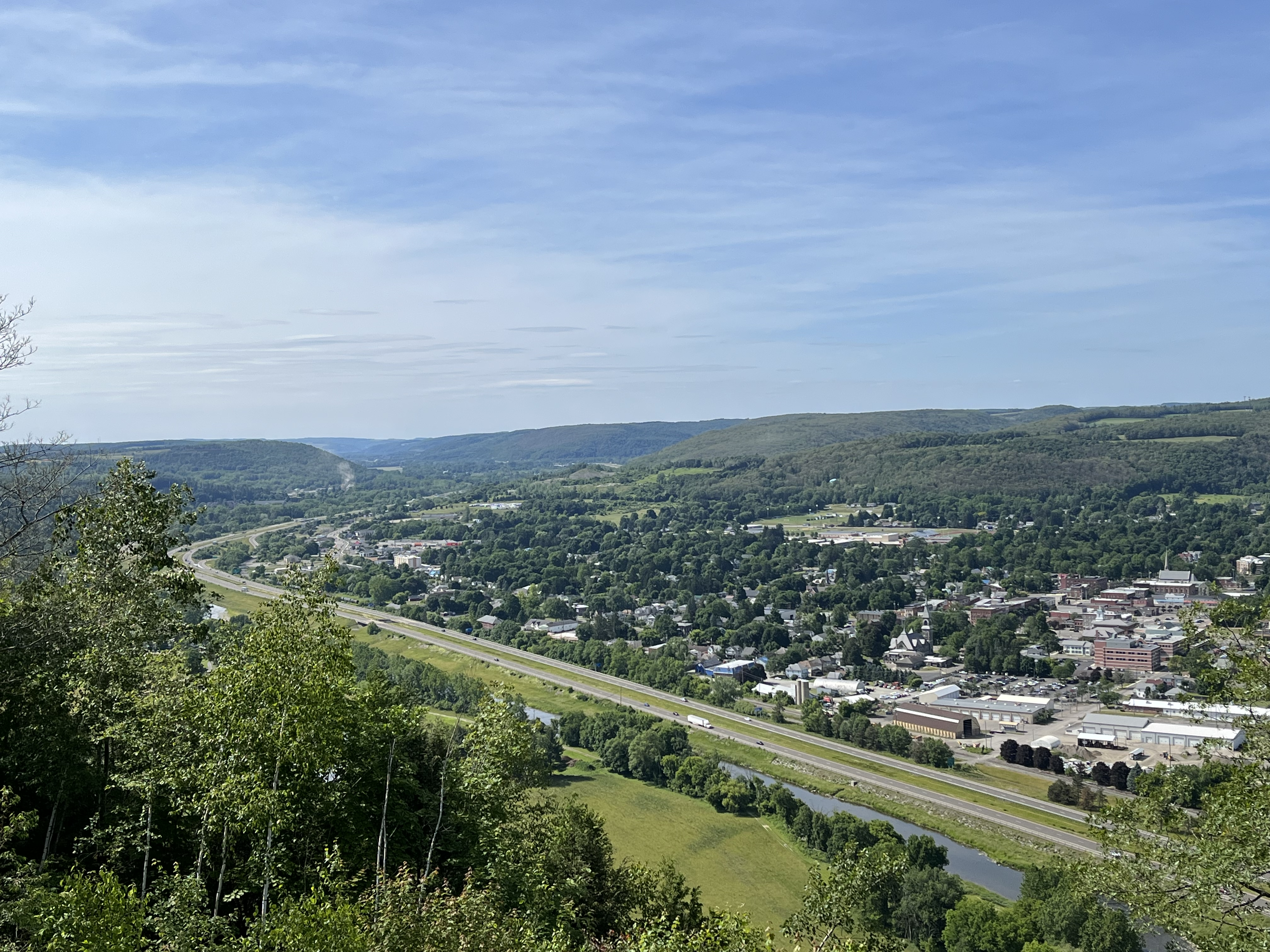
- A view of Bath

- Location within the state of New York
- Coordinates: 42°20′16″N 77°19′1″W
- Country: United States
- State: New York
- County: Steuben

Area
  - Total: 3.17 sq mi (8.22 km^{2})
  - Land: 3.17 sq mi (8.22 km^{2})
  - Water: 0 sq mi (0.00 km^{2})
- Elevation: 1,109 ft (338 m)

Population (2020)
  - Total: 5,571
  - Density: 1,756.1/sq mi (678.02/km^{2})
- Time zone: UTC-5 (Eastern (EST))
  - Summer (DST): UTC-4 (EDT)
- ZIP code: 14810
- Area code: 607
- FIPS code: 36-04759
- GNIS feature ID: 0943162
- Website: https://villageofbathny.gov/

Bath is a village in and the county seat of Steuben County, New York, United States. The population was 5,786 at the 2010 census. The village is located in the town of the same name, northwest of Elmira and west of Tyrone.

The community was named either for the English city of Bath, Somerset, or for Lady Laura Pulteney, 1st Countess of Bath and daughter of Sir William Pulteney, one of the original landowners. Bath is the location of the Bath VA Medical Center (former old soldiers' home), Bath National Cemetery, and the Steuben County Fair, the oldest continuous fair in the United States.

== History ==
The village was founded in 1793. The village was originally incorporated in 1816, but was not organized until 1836.

In addition to the Bath VA Medical Center, the James H. Bolton House, Campbell-Rumsey House, Cobblestone House, Davenport Library, Erie Freighthouse Historic District, The First Baptist Society of Bath, Gansevoort/East Steuben Streets Historic District, George W. Hallock House, Haverling Farm House, Liberty Street Historic District, McMaster House, Henry C. Myrtle House, Potter-Van Camp House, Martin A. Quick House, Reuben Robie House, Sedgwick House, William Shepherd House, United States Post Office, and M. J. Ward Feed Mill Complex are listed on the National Register of Historic Places.

Carl Carmer's novel "Genesee Fever," treating of the first white settlements in the region, is set largely in Bath. Bath was the site of the land office disposing of 1.2 million acres.

In 1804, Captain William Helm, a Virginian, settled in Bath with about 40 slaves, in an attempt to implant the plantation system in New York State.

== Geography ==
According to the United States Census Bureau, the village has a total area of 2.9 square miles (7.5 km^{2}), all land.

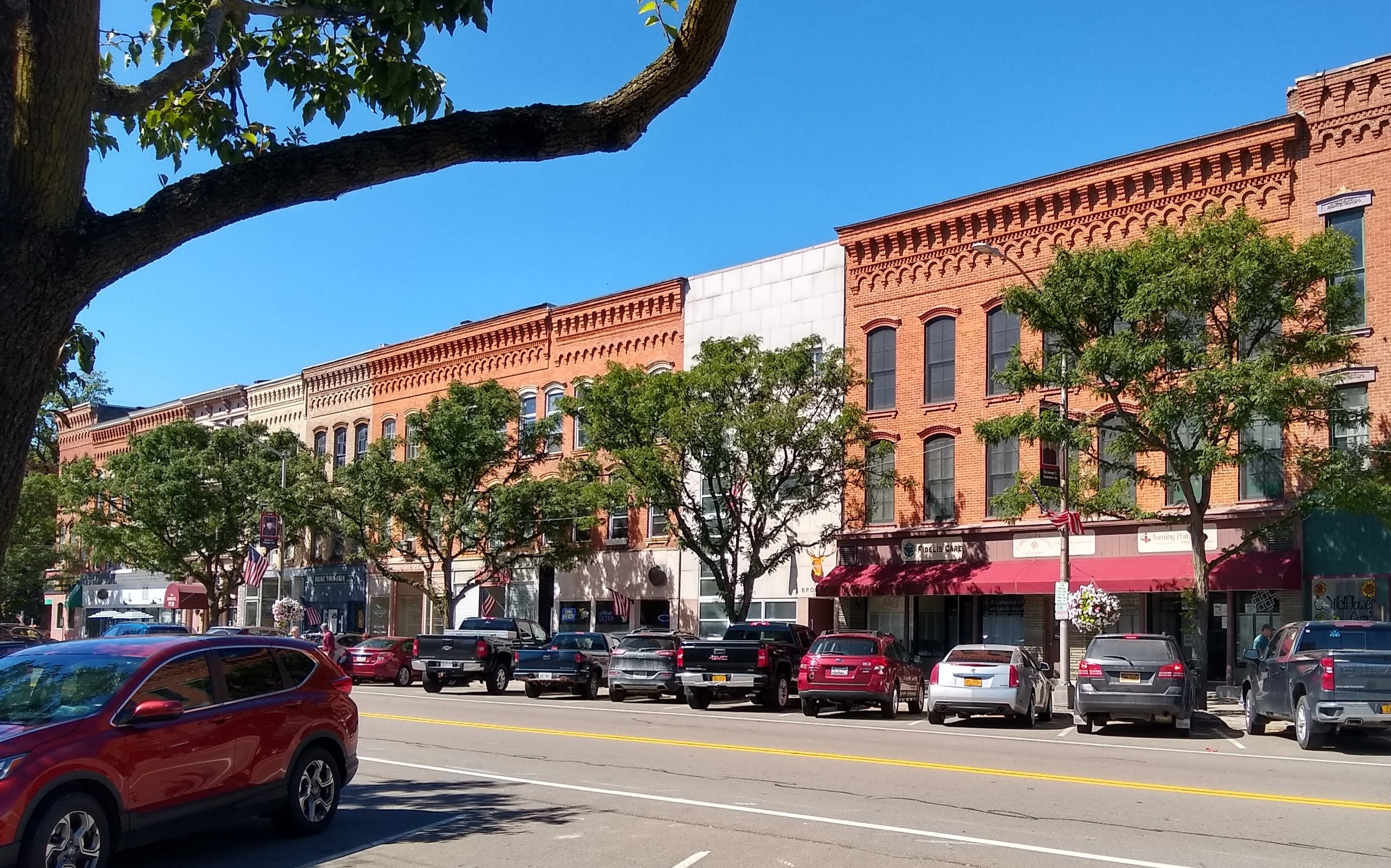
Liberty Street in downtown Bath

The village is adjacent to Interstate 86, a few miles east of the split with Interstate 390. New York State Route 54 intersects New York State Route 415 in the village. County Roads 10 and 13 also lead into Bath.

Bath is served by the Bath & Hammondsport Railroad which operates over former Delaware, Lackawanna & Western (DL&W) mainline trackage between a connection with Norfolk Southern in Painted Post, and the company's terminus in Cohocton. (Trackage to Wayland remains in place but is no longer used. Service on the original B&H between Bath and Hammondsport has also been discontinued.)

The Erie Railroad's Rochester Division once passed through Bath. The 1960 merger of the Erie and DL&W led to the creation of Erie-Lackawanna which was followed by the elimination of redundant trackage. The Erie line through Bath was abandoned, as was much of the DL&W west of Wayland. The result was a drastic reduction of railroad activity in Bath since traffic could be routed over the parallel ex-Erie mainline through the Canisteo River Valley.

Erie-Lackawanna was absorbed into the Consolidated Rail Corporation (Conrail) in 1976. In 1999, Conrail lines in the region were acquired by Norfolk Southern. Since then, the Bath & Hammondsport has become a subsidiary of the Livonia, Avon & Lakeville which currently operates the line, though not over any of its original route. Trains operate through Bath five days per week.

The Conhocton River flows through Bath, and Lake Salubria is a small artificial lake southeast of the village.

== Demographics ==
Historical population
Census	Pop.	Note	%±
1810	453		—
1830	1,000		—
1840	1,400		40.0%
1850	2,500		78.6%
1860	2,012		−19.5%
1870	1,465		−27.2%
1880	3,183		117.3%
1890	3,261		2.5%
1900	4,994		53.1%
1910	3,884		−22.2%
1920	3,720		−4.2%
1930	4,015		7.9%
1940	4,696		17.0%
1950	5,416		15.3%
1960	6,166		13.8%
1970	6,053		−1.8%
1980	6,042		−0.2%
1990	5,801		−4.0%
2000	5,641		−2.8%
2010	5,786		2.6%
2020	5,571		−3.7%
U.S. Decennial Census

As of the census of 2000, there were 5,641 people, 2,612 households, and 1,400 families residing in the village. The population density was 1,959.9 inhabitants per square mile (756.7/km^{2}). There were 2,826 housing units at an average density of 981.9 per square mile (379.1/km^{2}). The racial makeup of the village was 96.19% White, 1.38% Black or African American, 0.32% Native American, 0.89% Asian, 0.02% Pacific Islander, 0.12% from other races, and 1.08% from two or more races. Hispanic or Latino of any race were 0.90% of the population.

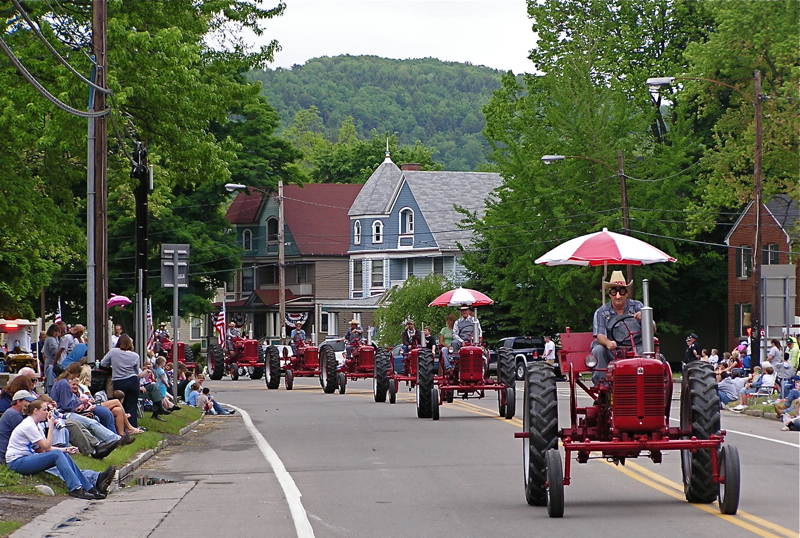
Antique tractors in Bath, New York's annual dairy parade.

There were 2,612 households, out of which 24.0% had children under the age of 18 living with them, 38.2% were married couples living together, 12.1% had a female householder with no husband present, and 46.4% were non-families. 40.0% of all households were made up of individuals, and 20.5% had someone living alone who was 65 years of age or older. The average household size was 2.14 and the average family size was 2.85.

In the village, the population was spread out, with 21.9% under the age of 18, 8.0% from 18 to 24, 25.0% from 25 to 44, 24.6% from 45 to 64, and 20.5% who were 65 years of age or older. The median age was 42 years. For every 100 females, there were 91.7 males. For every 100 females age 18 and over, there were 87.8 males.

The median income for a household in the village was $28,897, and the median income for a family was $39,114. Males had a median income of $31,685 versus $25,087 for females. The per capita income for the village was $18,337. About 10.8% of families and 15.5% of the population were below the poverty line, including 16.6% of those under age 18 and 8.5% of those age 65 or over.

== Schools ==
The village is covered by the Bath Central School District.

== Notable people ==
- Frank Bowes, former professional baseball player
- Ira Davenport, former US Congressman
- George Grueb (1835–1893), Medal of Honor recipient in the American Civil War, was buried in Bath.
- Edward Howell, former US Congressman
- Frank Fernando Jones, former Iowa legislator and businessman
- Jermain Wesley Loguen (1813 – 1872), taught the first school for colored in Bath, 1843–1846, and was minister.
- John Magee, former US Congressman
- Bob McNeely, photographer who served as the Chief Official White House Photographer
- Reuben Robie, former US Congressman
- David Rumsey, former US Congressman
- Edwin S. Underhill, former US Congressman
- James A. Wetmore, US acting Supervising Architect
- William Woods, former US Congressman

== See also ==
- Hammondsport, New York
