= Northrop =

Northrop may refer to:

== Businesses ==
- Northrop Corporation, an American aircraft manufacturer formed in 1939
- Northrop Grumman, an American aircraft manufacturer formed in 1994 as a merger of the above company with Grumman
- Northrop Loom, an American designed weaving loom

== Places ==
=== United States ===
- Northrop, Minnesota, a town
- Northrop, Minneapolis, Minnesota, a neighborhood
- Northrop Auditorium, on the Minneapolis campus of the University of Minnesota
- Northrop Field, a former stadium for the University of Minnesota
- Northrop High School, Fort Wayne, Indiana
- Northrop University, a former aviation institute
- Mount Northrop, Minnesota

== People ==
- Northrop (surname), including a list of people with the name
- Northrop Frye (1912–1991), Canadian literary theorist
- Suzane Northrop (born 1948), American self-proclaimed psychic medium

== See also ==
- Northrup (disambiguation)
