= Northrup =

Northrup may refer to:

== People ==
=== Given name ===
- Northrup R. Knox (1928–1998), banker in Buffalo, New York

=== Surname ===
- Christiane Northrup (born 1949), Obstetrician-gynecologist who promotes anti vaccine and medical pseudoscience
- Samuel Northrup (1801–1860), member of the Wisconsin State Assembly
- William Barton Northrup (1856–1925), Canadian lawyer and politician
- Edwin Fitch Northrup (1866–1940), professor of physics at Princeton University
- Theodore Havermeyer Northrup (1866–1919), American ragtime composer
- Harry Northrup (1875–1936), French-American film actor of the silent film era
- Phil Northrup (1898–1973), American track and field athlete
- Leonard L. Northrup Jr. (1918–2016), American inventor and businessman
- Sara Northrup Hollister (1924–1997), American involved in the early formation of Dianetics
- Jim Northrup (baseball) (1939–2011), nicknamed the “Silver Fox”, a former Major League Baseball player, mostly as a member of the Detroit Tigers
- Jim Northrup (writer) (born 1943), Anishinaabe (Native American) newspaper columnist, poet, performer and political commentator
- Bruce Northrup (born 1955), politician in New Brunswick, Canada
- David Northrup (born 1961), American politician
- Tony Northrup (born 1974), American author, photographer, and video instructor
- Patricia Northrup, American military pilot and a former Miss California

== Places ==
- Northrup-Gilbert House, a historic home located at Phoenix in Oswego County, New York
- Northrup Hill School District 10, a historic one-room school building located at Rathbone in Steuben County, New York
- Palmer-Northrup House, an historic site at 7919 Post Road in North Kingstown, Rhode Island

== Other ==
- Northrup-King, an agricultural seed company in Minnesota
- Northrup & O'Brien, an American architectural firm that lasted from 1916 to 1953

== See also ==
- Solomon Northup (1808–?), violinist abducted and sold as a slave, later an abolitionist writer
- Stephen Northup House, a historic house at 99 Featherbed Lane in North Kingstown, Rhode Island
- Anson Northup, a riverboat that offers tours in the Mississippi Twin Cities area
- Northrop (disambiguation)
- Northrop Corporation, United States aircraft manufacturer
- Northrop Grumman, American global aerospace and defense technology company
