= 50th New York Engineer Regiment =

- Active: August 26 - September 20, 1861 (as 50th Infantry); October 22, 1861 - June 13–14, 1865
- Country: United States
- Allegiance: United States of America; Union
- Branch: Engineers
- Size: 873 (1861), 830 (1862) (Note: As reported for their departure from the state on September 21, 1861 and in annual report December 31, 1862.)
- Nicknames: Stuart's Engineers; Independent Engineers; Sappers, Miners And Pontoniers
- Equipment: Model 1822 Musket (069 Cal., smoothbore) (Note: These were converted from flintlock to percussion cap during the 1840s. 873 were reported for their departure from the state on September 21, 1861. 830 were reported a year later. and drawn from existing militia stocks.)
- Engagements: Siege of Yorktown; Seven Days Battles; Battle of Malvern Hill; Battle of Fredericksburg; Pollock's Mill Creek; Battle of Chancellorsville; Second Battle of Fredericksburg; Bank's Ford; Battle of Deep Run; Battle of Gettysburg; Mine Run Campaign; Battle of the Wilderness; Battle of Spotsylvania Court House; Battle of North Anna; Battle of Totopotomoy Creek; Battle of Cold Harbor; Second Battle of Petersburg; Battle of Jerusalem Plank Road; First Battle of Deep Bottom; Battle of Hatcher's Run; Battle of White Oak Road; Fall of Petersburg; Battle of Appomattox Court House

Commanders
- Colonel: Charles B. Stuart

Insignia
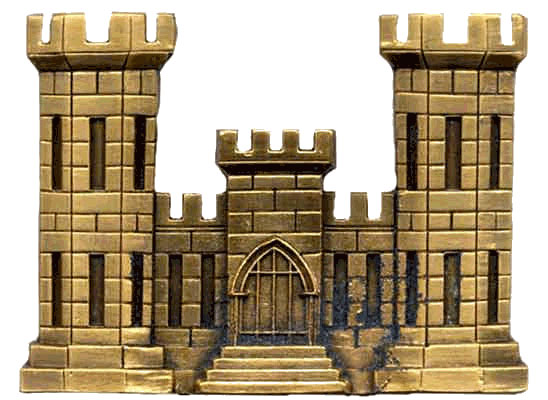
- Volunteer Engineer Brigade

The 50th New York Engineer Regiment was an engineer regiment that served in the Union Army during the American Civil War. The regiment was initially raised as the 50th Volunteer Infantry, but was converted to an engineer regiment after it arrived in Washington DC. It served as an engineer unit for the Army of the Potomac (AoP) from the Peninsula Campaign through the Appomattox Campaign.

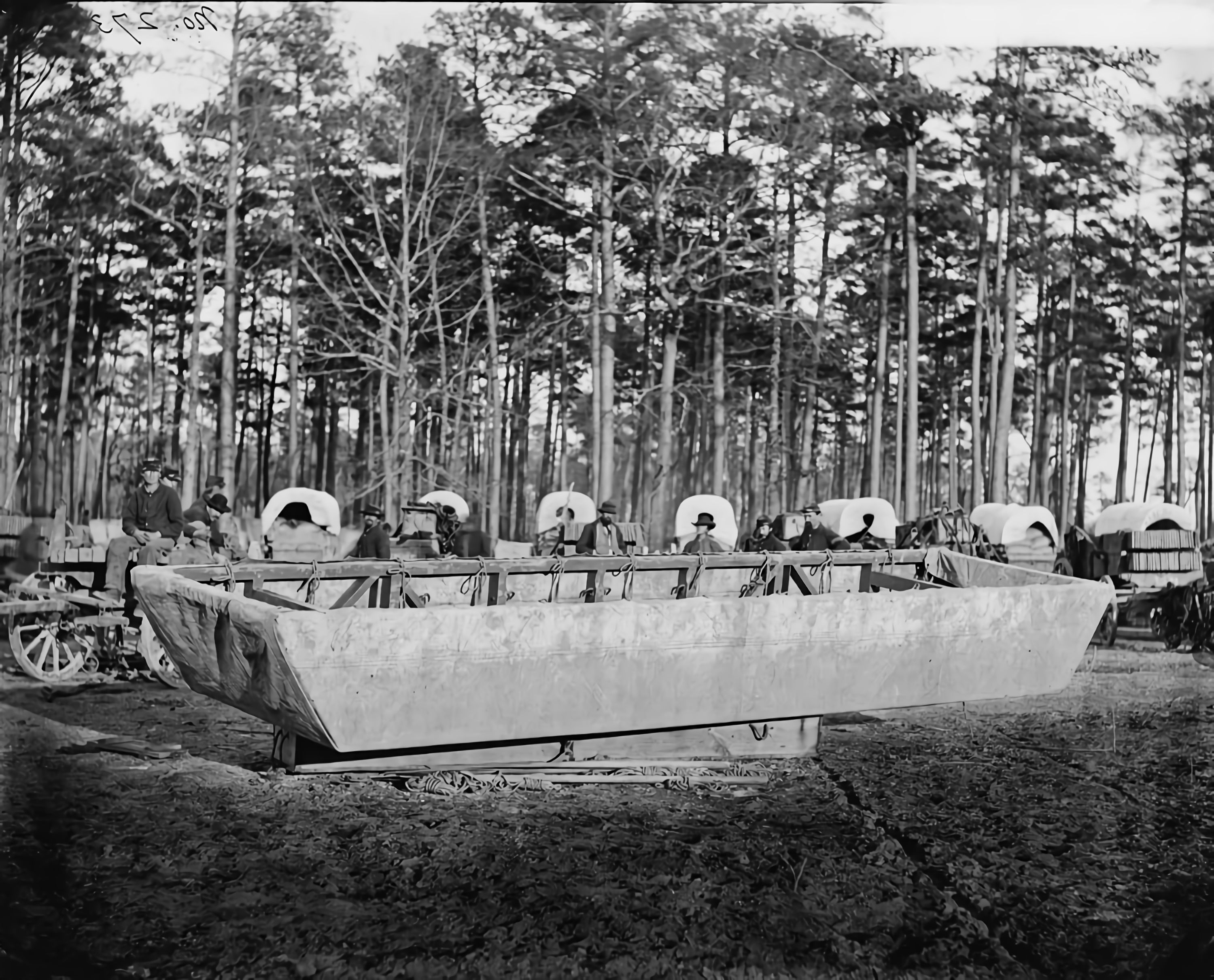
Rappahannock Station, Va. Canvas pontoon boat, 50th New York Engineers

== Organization and muster ==
COL Charles B. Stuart had received, July 26, 1861, authority to recruit a regiment of infantry, which he organized at Elmira, and which was designated September 20, 1861, the 50th Regiment of Infantry. The companies were mustered in the service of the United States for three years at Elmira:

- A September 18 - from Addison, Bath, Lodi, Painted Post and Savona
- B August 16 - from Auburn, Elmira, Geneva, Syracuse, Waterloo, and Honesdale (Pennsylvania)
- C September 17 - from Chemung, Elmira, Rome and Union
- D September 18 - from Elmira, Fulton, Geneva, Ogdensburgh, Oswego, Syracuse and Watkins
- E August 29 - from Buffalo, Elmira, Maine, Niagara Falls, North Hector, Penn Yan and Rome
- F September 17 - from Geneva, Elmira, Oswego, Potsdam and Union, and at Scranton, Honesdale, Mt. Pleasant and Moscow, (Pennsylvania)
- G September 16 - from Caroline, Elmira, Greece, Hornellsville, Maine and Millport
- H September 16 - from Elmira, Maine, Malone, Ogdensburgh, Potsdam, Watkins, and at Williamsport, (Pennsylvania)
- I August 26 - from Elmira, Geneva, Owego and Union, and at Hancock and Scranton, (Pennsylvania)
- K September 30 - from Elmira, Ovid, Savona, Seneca Falls and Union

In 1860 the army Corps of Engineers consisted of just 44 officers and 100 soldiers for an army of 15,000 soldiers. After the formation of the Confederacy and the Battle of Fort Sumter, Congress authorized a massive increase in the number of specialized engineer troops on August 3, 1861, to complement the growing Union Army. On October 22, 1861, in Virginia, the regiment was converted into and designated the Fiftieth, Regiment of Engineers.

Two new companies, L and M, mustered in the United States service for three years in December, 1863, and January and February, 1864, joined the regiment in December, 1863, and February, 1864, respectively. They were recruited from:

- L - Rochester, Buffalo, Canandaigua, Elmira and Phelps
- M - Albany, Buffalo, Canandaigua, Elmira and Oswego.

Quite a number of men enlisted for this regiment in 1864 were assigned to the 15th N. Y. Volunteer Engineers. At the expiration of its term of service the men entitled thereto were discharged and the regiment continued in service.

== Service ==
When the regiment was converted by special orders from the war department into a regiment of engineers, it was ordered to Washington, where instruction was received by the men in their new duties. They were joining a Corps of Engineers that would play a significant role in the American Civil War. Many of the men who would serve in the top leadership in this organization were West Point graduates. Several rose to military fame and power during the Civil War. Some examples include Union generals George McClellan, Henry Halleck, and George Meade; and Confederate generals Robert E. Lee, Joseph Johnston, and P.G.T. Beauregard. The Corps were responsible for building pontoon and railroad bridges, forts and batteries, destroying enemy supply lines (including railroads), and constructing roads for the movement of troops and supplies. Both sides recognized the critical work of engineers. On 6 March 1861, once the South had seceded from the Union, its legislature passed an act to create a Confederate Corps of Engineers.

One of the main projects for the Army Corps of Engineers was constructing and reconstructing railroads and bridges. Union forces took advantage of such Confederate infrastructure because railroads and bridges provided access to resources and industry. The Confederate engineers, in contrast used slave labor, on their engineering projects. Through the war, the United States used these Engineer troops as a cadre, adding regular troops, and hiring former slaves to bolster them as needed.

=== 1862 ===
In March, 1862, the AoP, commanded by the engineer, McClellan, embarked on the Peninsula Campaign. With the volunteer engineers' brigade under BGEN Henry Washington Benham, the 50th moved to Yorktown and worked digging trenches, constructing bridges, and earthworks until the evacuation of that city. At White House, the command was divided into several detachments, which were engaged in escort duty and bridge building until reunited at Dispatch Station on June 1, when the regiment was employed in providing for the passage of the troops over the Chickahominy. It accompanied the army through the Seven Days' battles to Harrison's landing, where it was again separated, one detachment being sent to Hampton. When the regimental headquarters was transferred to Hampton in August, a detachment was left behind at Harrison's landing, but on Sept. 3 the regiment was reunited at Washington.

Until July 17, 1862, the 50th was enrolled on the state records as an infantry regiment, but an act of Congress of that date accepted it as a regiment of the volunteer engineer corps, of the same rank as the regular army engineer corps.

Four companies were detached on Sept 12 and ordered to Harper's Ferry, where they were engaged in constructing pontoons and later returned in charge of two of the pontoons to Washington, leaving a part of the detachment behind. Another detachment was sent to the vicinity of Fredericksburg with these boats, and the headquarters of the regiment were transferred to Acquia creek, leaving one company at Washington. After Antietam. the 50th threw two pontoon bridges over the Potomac at Berlin, for the AoP's crossing in pursuit of Lee.

==== The Bridges at Fredericksburg ====
After McClellan failed to pursue Lee's retreat from Antietam, Lincoln fired McClellan on Wednesday, November 5, 1862, and replaced him with MGEN Burnside on Friday. Formally taking command on Sunday, November 9, 1862, Burnside immediately received pressure from Lincoln to take aggressive action. In response to prodding from Lincoln and general-in-chief MGEN Halleck, Burnside planned a late fall offensive that the relied on quick movement and deception. Concentrating his army in a visible fashion near Warrenton, feigning a movement on Culpeper Court House, Orange Court House or Gordonsville, he would then rapidly shift southeast and cross the Rappahannock River to Fredericksburg, hoping to steal a march on Lee. The AoP would then move rapidly south along the Richmond, Fredericksburg and Potomac Railroad (RF&P) against Richmond.He chose this course lest he strike directly south from Warrenton, exposed to a flanking attack from LTGEN Jackson in the Shenandoah Valley and because he felt the Orange and Alexandria Railroad (O&A) would be an inadequate for logistics as well as the fact that Lee had blocked the O&A.

While Burnside began assembling a supply base at Falmouth, Washington reviewed the plan. Lincoln, correctly, saw the main goal was the destruction of Lee and his army and not Richmond, but despite this when Burnside presented his plan on Thursday, November 14, Lincoln reluctantly approved it. Halleck wired Burnside, "The President has just assented to your plan," adding for emphasis: "He thinks that it will succeed if you move rapidly; otherwise not."

Burnside saw the rapid movement of his army as key to catching Lee, off guard, and that the river crossing could be made before Lee could concentrate his forces at Fredericksburg and contest the crossing. The Rappahannock, a short river rising in the mountains, is not much more than a mountain stream until Warrenton where several tributaries swell it into a river, the principal one being the Rapidan. At Fredericksburg it is quite deep below the falls and can be crossed only by bridges. Opposite the northern end of Fredericksburg was a smaller town, Falmouth. They were both mill towns that had prospered grounding the local grains into flour. Powered by canals as well as the river, the mills tapped the river above the dam. In the antebellum era, bridges had connected the two towns but they had been destroyed during Johnston's withdrawal a year before. Any crossing would need to be done at a ford or with pontoon bridges. The 50th, like the other AoP engineers, were well-practiced in assembling pontoons as well as manipulating canals for various purposes.

Burnside went into action immediately. On Friday, November 15, he began to pull his army out of the Warrenton, Virginia area and head southeast towards Fredericksburg. That morning, AoP artillery roused the Confederates. IX Corps struck the Rappahannock River at Warrenton Springs, and I Corps demonstrated focusing on Freeman's and Beverly's fords to the east. Cavalry and infantry attacked Rebels at Rappahannock Station and captured the bridge there intact.

The sudden action on a wide front surprised Lee who began a pullback from his position in front of the Army of the Potomac. Unsure of the Federals’ destination, Lee had to hold back and see how the situation developed before he could make a countermove. Unsure about Burnside's movements, he sent an infantry regiment and an artillery battery to strengthen a small force stationed at Fredericksburg. If Burnside had already crossed and occupied the town, Lee would withdraw North Anna River. Anticipating that Fredericksburg could not be held, Lee got permission to destroy the railroad between Fredericksburg and Hanover Junction. Lee had yet to hear intelligence that AoP was rebuilding the wharves at Aquia Creek, so as Sumner's troops approached Falmouth, Lee still thought it likely that Burnside would transfer his army south of the James River.

Burnside had moved rapidly on Friday and Saturday without Lee discovering his intent. On Sunday evening, when he heard Sumner's men were approaching Falmouth, Lee immediately had Longstreet send two of his divisions toward Fredericksburg. As these units left their camps the next morning, Monday, November 18, Stuart's scouts forded the Rappahannock arriving at Warrenton just as the last U.S. troops were departing.

In the meantime, when the AoP started from Warrenton, Sumner's grand division was given the advance; II Corps arrived on Sunday evening, the 17th at Falmouth, opposite the upper edge of Fredericksburg. Burnside had fooled Lee made it opposite Fredericksburg almost undetected. Next, he needed to get the army across the Rappahannock and push on to Richmond.

When Sumner arrived at Falmouth, Fredericksburg was occupied only by a small force. As soon as the Union troops appeared on the Stafford Heights, an artillery duel began. The Rebels were soon driven from the guns. Standing unmanned, the Rebel guns tempted Sumner to cross the river and capture them. Lest he incur Burnside's wrath, Sumner would not permit volunteers to go over and get them, but he did ask permission to take Fredericksburg, if he (Sumner) could find a crossing. (Note: In fact, Sumner and his men later wrote that they could have crossed at the dam, or a few miles above it without trouble.) Burnside turned him down as he felt it unwise to take Fredericksburg before he had fully established his communications. He was also concerned that the increasing autumn rains would make the fording points unusable and that Sumner might be cut off and destroyed. He ordered Sumner to wait in Falmouth ending the matter, and the troops went into camp waiting for orders.

When the rest of the AoP arrived two days later, Hooker also suggested crossing, this time at United States Ford, just a few miles upriver. Burnside, mindful of McClellans problems when a river divided his forces in the Peninsula campaign, again worried that the high water would do the same to him and chose to wait.

Burnside became anxious, concerned that the increasing autumn rains would make the fording points unusable and that Sumner might be cut off and destroyed, ordering Sumner to wait in Falmouth.

===== Transporting the Pontoons to Fredericksburg =====
Before beginning his campaign, Burnside had arranged for the shipment of the pontoon wagon trains through the Union Army's General in Chief, Henry Halleck. (Note: Burnside first ordered them a week before Lincoln's approval (along with many other provisions) on November 7.) Burnside had planned for the pontoons to arrive the same time as his first elements on Sunday evening, November 17, however, his plans began failing for the pontoon bridges and bridging materials had not arrived and were just leaving Washington.

The plan called for both riverine and overland movement of the pontoon trains to Falmouth. On November 14, MAJ Ira Spaulding of the 50th reported the pontoons ready to move but lacking the 270 horses needed to move them. Unknown to Burnside, most of the bridging was still on the upper Potomac. Communications between Burnside's staff engineer Cyrus B. Comstock and the Engineer Brigade commander Daniel P. Woodbury indicate that Burnside had assumed the bridging was en route to Washington based on orders given on November 6.

When Halleck visited Burnside it was agreed that they were to be rapidly transported south, to be used in crossing the Rappahannock. Halleck returned to Washington and resumed the duties of his office, evidently not understanding that he was to charge himself with this special duty, therefore neither Halleck nor Quartermaster General Montgomery Meigs, who was responsible for supplying necessary equipment and supplies for the pontoon trains, acted with the urgency needed. Just before he cut his communications with Washington on Sunday, November 17, to make his move, he had tasked his Chief Engineer LT Cyrus B. Comstock to check the status of the pontoons' movement. Receiving no answer before beginning his march, it would be two days before he found out where they were. In fact, when Sumner had army arrived opposite Fredericksburg, they were still at Washington, Burnside supposing that Halleck would forward them without delay.

Due to the miscommunication between Burnside and Washington in the planning stages, Comstock's queries caused confusion followed by sudden urgency. The 50th New York Engineers left Washington with one of two pontoon trains on November 19, traveling overland to Falmouth.

Lee, expecting an imminent advance across the Rappahannock, assume the next defensible position to the south, the North Anna River. But when he saw how slowly Burnside was moving (and Confederate President Jefferson Davis expressed reservations about planning for a battle so close to Richmond), he directed all of his army toward Fredericksburg. By November 23, the corps commanded by LTGEN James Longstreet had arrived and Lee placed them on the ridge known as Marye's Heights to the west of town, with Anderson's division on the far left, McLaws's directly behind the town, and Pickett's and Hood's to the right. He sent for Jackson on November 26, but his Second Corps commander had anticipated the need and began forced-marching his troops from Winchester on November 22, covering as many as 20 miles a day. Jackson arrived at Lee's headquarters on November 29 and his divisions were deployed to prevent Burnside crossing downstream from Fredericksburg: D.H. Hill's division moved to Port Royal, 18 miles down river; Early's 12 miles down river at Skinker's Neck; A.P. Hill's at Thomas Yerby's house, "Belvoir", about 6 miles southeast of town; and Taliaferro's along the RF&P Railroad, 4 miles south at Guinea Station.

Heavy rains turned the roads to mud and slowed progress. A second pontoon train had been sent down the Potomac River to the town of Aquia Landing; from there, the train would travel overland the last few miles. With the roads impassable due to the mud, the overland train was diverted to the Potomac River, the pontoon boats were formed into rafts, and towed down river to Aquia Landing. The engineers and equipment did not arrive at Falmouth until November 25. By this time Lee's army was arriving, and the opportunity to cross the Rappahannock River uncontested was gone. Burnside still had an opportunity, however, because by then he was facing only half of Lee's army, not yet dug in, and if he acted quickly, he might have been able to attack Longstreet and defeat him before Jackson arrived. Once again he squandered his opportunity. The full complement of bridges arrived at the end of the month, but by this time Jackson was present and Longstreet was preparing strong defenses.

Burnside originally planned to cross his army east of Fredericksburg at Skinker's Neck, but an advance movement by Federal gunboats to there was fired upon and drew Early's and D.H. Hill's divisions into that area, a movement spotted by Union balloon observers. Now assuming that Lee had anticipated his plan, Burnside guessed that the Confederates had weakened their left and center to concentrate against him on their right. So he decided to cross directly at Fredericksburg. On December 9, he wrote to Halleck, "I think now the enemy will be more surprised by a crossing immediately in our front than any other part of the river. ... I'm convinced that a large force of the enemy is now concentrated at Port Royal, its left resting on Fredericksburg, which we hope to turn." In addition to his numerical advantage in troop strength, Burnside also had the advantage of knowing his army could not be attacked effectively. On the other side of the Rappahannock, 220 artillery pieces had been located on the ridge known as Stafford Heights to prevent Lee's army from mounting any major counterattacks.

On Tuesday evening of 9 December, Burnside presented his plan of attack to his subordinate. The army would cross at three sites simultaneously. Sumner's Right Grand Division would cross on two pontoon bridges at the northern end of town and a third at the southern end. Once across, Sumner would clear Fredericksburg and advance to drive the Rebels from Marye's Heights. Franklin's Left Grand Division would cross on two bridges two miles below town. Hooker's Center Grand Division would remain in reserve, ready to exploit any success. His artillery chief, BGEN Hunt, placed the army's 312 guns, with 147 of them on the advantageous high ground of Stafford Heights, to support the crossing. Burnside was scant on specifics regarding follow-on actions, rebuffing his subordinates' lack of confidence in the plan. Despite the lack of detail, they reluctantly left the meeting with their reservations and began moving their troops into position Monday evening, December 10.

===== Constructing the Bridges =====
The engineer brigade moved out after dark. The 15th New York left camp at 20:00, the regulars at 22:00, and the 50th at 23:00. The engineers stopped briefly at the pontoon park and outfitted their trains for the night's assignment. The teams started for their assigned bridge sites by 23:50. As soon as the engineers stirred, the army "knew that the moment for action had arrived for the Pontoons were moving for the river." The 50th New York left the pontoon park first, followed by the U.S. Engineers and the 15th New York. For some unknown reason, the 50th New York started its march first even though the other engineers had farther to go to get into position. On the night of December 10, the 15th New York Engineers and the U.S. Regular Engineer Battalion quietly moved to a position about a mile down river from Fredericksburg. The engineers built two bridges at this site, facing little opposition. When the bridges were nearly complete, a small Confederate force charged the engineers and inflicted some casualties, but Union artillery fire drove the attackers away. The two bridges were finished by 11:00.

The 50th New York Engineers were charged with the task of building three bridges in two locations; one at the southern end of town and two at the northern end. The 50th New York Engineers rumbled along heavily rutted dirt roads with three bulky pontoon trains. With so many men, horses, and equipment in motion, secrecy was impossible as each caravan toted 34 pontoon boats on wheels accompanied by 29 support vehicles laden with lumber, tools, and forges. 189 wagons lurched into a ravine behind the Lacy house.

At the river's edge with no light to work, the men of the 50th settled down for quick a nap before building the bridges. The night was cold with the temperature in the mid-twenties and thin ice along the riverbanks. A thick fog covered the river. Brainerd rested in the parlor of the Lacy house, listening to the bell from Saint George's Episcopal Church toll 03:00, and wrote his goodbyes to his family. As soon as he was done, with the bell still ringing the hour, got his command moving.

Work began as the 50th moved the heavy pontoon boats down the muddy banks of Stafford Heights and into the icy waters of the Rappahannock. The 50th divided into three sections. CAPT Wesley Brainerd and CAPT George W. Ford kept two trains behind the Lacy house, while CAPT James H. McDonald led the third train south to the lower end of the city. MAJ Spaulding accompanied McDonald's crew to a point below the burned railroad bridge of the RF&P Railroad. Surgeons set up hospitals on Claiborne Run, while assistants selected forward aid stations closer to Stafford Heights.

On the opposite shore, BGEN William Barksdale alerted his commander, MGEN Lafayette McLaws, that Federal bridge building had commenced. McLaws instructed Barksdale to allow the construction to continue until the engineers were within close range. Barksdale moved his brigade, consisting of the 13th, 17th, 18th, and 21st Mississippi Infantry regiments, along with some reinforcements from the 8th Florida Infantry into position along the river. The men took cover in buildings, behind fences, and in rifle pits.

As the 50th went to work on the pontoons, they could make out the flickering campfires more than 400 yards away on the opposite bank but also noticed them being extinguished. Shortly after 05:00, the Confederates opened fire on the engineers working on the bridges and on the opposite riverbank. Initially, fog on the water provided some cover for the 50th, but as the light increased and fog dissipated three hours later, with one of the upper bridges and the middle bridge about two-thirds complete and the other upper bridge about one-quarter finished, Rebel fire increased at the engineers. The bullets the engineers, and a minié ball instantly killed CAPT. Augustus Perkins of the 50th. Wounded soldiers dove into the boats while others crawled back to safety to avoid the heavy musketry of the rest of Barksdale's Mississippians. With Union infantry able to offer little support, the engineers retreated, regrouped, and tried again on the upper bridges. The Confederate musket fire killed one officer and two enlisted men on the northern bridge site, and wounded several others. The unarmed engineers ran for the shore and took cover as the enemy fire raked the Federal positions.

At the middle bridge, downstream from the ruined rail bridge, crews ventured out to complete the bridge four times but came scurrying back, and by 10:00 a.m. the 50th had suffered fifty casualties, including a seriously wounded CAPT Brainerd. BGEN Woodbury led 40 volunteers from the 8th Connecticut onto one of the bridges, but soon lost 20 men and hastily retreated. Two regiments in Hancock's division also suffered casualties near the upper bridges.

Brigadier General Henry Hunt, the Army of the Potomac's Chief of Artillery, had placed his batteries on Stafford Heights, east of the town. The artillery began firing at the Confederate positions in Fredericksburg. After considerable bombardment, the cannonade stopped and the engineers attempted to resume their work, only to be hit by more Confederate fire and again driven back. The artillery resumed blasting Fredericksburg, and when the firing eased, the engineers again tried to resume work, and were again driven back by Barksdale's determined riflemen. Union infantry across the river also exchanged fire with the Mississippians.

This continued well into the afternoon. To break the stalemate, General Hunt suggested to Burnside that infantrymen be sent across the river in boats to secure a small bridgehead and rout the sharpshooters. Burnside agreed to the idea if Hunt would find volunteers for the risky venture. COL Norman J. Hall volunteered his brigade (Note: This was 3rd Brigade of MGEN Howard's 2nd Division of MGEN Couch's II Corps. It consisted of the 19th and 20th Massachusetts, the 7th Michigan, and the 42nd and 59th New York)for this assignment. Burnside suddenly turned reluctant, lamenting to Hall in front of his men that "the effort meant death to most of those who should undertake the voyage." When his men responded to Hall's request with three cheers, Burnside relented. At 15:00, the Union artillery began a preparatory bombardment and 135 infantrymen from the 7th Michigan and 19th Massachusetts crowded into the small boats, and the 20th Massachusetts and 42nd New York followed soon after. They crossed successfully and spread out in a skirmish line to clear the sharpshooters. Although some of the Confederates surrendered, fighting proceeded street by street through the town as the engineers completed the bridges.

With Hall's attack, the 50th were able to complete their bridges rapidly. Sumner's Right Grand Division began crossing at 16:30, but the bulk of his men did not cross until December 12. Hooker's Center Grand Division crossed on December 13, using both the northern and southern bridges..

The Regulars and the 1st New York detachments who had a comparatively easier time saw much less eventful crossings south of the city by Franklin's Left Grand Division. They had both bridges were completed by 11:00 on December 11 while five batteries of Union artillery suppressed most sniper fire against the engineers. Franklin was ordered at 16:00 to cross his entire command, but only a single brigade was sent over before dark. Crossings resumed at dawn and were completed by 13:00 on Thursday, December 12. Early on December 13, Jackson recalled his divisions under Jubal Early and D.H. Hill from down river positions to join his main defensive lines south of the city.

The clearing of the city buildings by Sumner's infantry and by artillery fire from across the river began the first major urban combat of both the war and American history. Union gunners sent more than 5,000 shells against the town and the ridges to the west. By nightfall, four brigades of Union troops occupied the town. These troops fresh from the bitter street fighting looted with a fury that had not been seen in the war up to that point. Most of the slaves left behind by the townsfolk, their erstwhile masters, took action and emancipated themselves by crossing the pontoon bridges in the other direction. (Note: The AoP had first come by Fredericksburg in the spring of 1862, and many slaves had freed themselves by crossing the river. This time was the start of an occupation that would last four months until AoP left for the Antietam campaign. During that four months, over ten thousand slaves escaped the area, making this one of the largest self-emancipations in the war. Many soldiers in the AoP were struck by the contrast in the fear and bitterness of the white townsmen who had not left and the joy of the slaves who took control of their own destiny and crossed over to Falmouth.) This behavior enraged Lee, who compared the AoP's looting with those of the ancient Vandals. The destruction and the escape of slaves also angered the Confederate troops, many of whom were native Virginians. Many on the Union side were also shocked by the destruction inflicted on Fredericksburg. Civilian casualties were unusually low given the widespread destruction; George Rable estimates no more than four civilian deaths.

The 50th had suffered all the fatalities of the Volunteer Engineer Brigade, 1 officer and 7 enlisted men killed with a further 3 officers and 39 enlisted men wounded. This was a heavy loss for the highly trained men of the 50th, but they managed to persevere and complete the bridges. The 50th had learned a lot from the experience that would inform their tactics as well as those of the AoP in the future.

The next day was the scene of one of the AoP's most horrendous defeats on Marye's Heights.

=== 1863 ===
After passing the winter in the neighborhood of Fredericksburg, the regiment joined in the Chancellorsville campaign, where it aided effectively in conveying the army across the river and was highly praised by their commander, BGEN Benham. At Deep Run in June, the 50th suffered the loss of 11 in killed, wounded and missing, while engaged in laying a bridge. The end of the month saw an engineer again in command of the AoP, Meade when they moved with the army through the Gettysburg Campaign. After the repulse of the Rebels, companies A, C, F, G, H and K remained in the field with the AoP during the summer and fall of 1863 and the others were stationed in Washington. In Dec., 1863, about three fourths of the regiment reenlisted and received their veteran furlough. In the winter of 1863-64 two new companies (companies L and M) were added to the regiment and the ranks filled with new recruits.

=== 1864 ===
The new year also brought a new commander to the eastern theater, Ulysses S. Grant. The victor of Fort Donelson, Shiloh, Vicksburg, and Chattanooga had been promoted on March 2, 1864, lieutenant general, and given command of all Union Armies. Grant established his headquarters with Meade in Culpeper, north-west of Richmond, and met weekly with Lincoln and Stanton in Washington. (Note: Meade had followed Halleck's cautious approach to fighting, and Grant was there to give him direction and encourage aggressiveness.) He planned five coordinated U.S. offensives, so the Rebels could not shift troops along interior lines. Grant and Meade would make a direct frontal attack on Lee's Army of Northern Virginia, while Sherman—now chief of the western armies—was to destroy Joseph E. Johnston's Army of Tennessee and take Atlanta. MGEN Butler would advance on Lee from the southeast, up the James River with the Army of the James (AoJ), while Major General Nathaniel Banks would capture Mobile. MGEN Franz Sigel was tasked with taking the fertile Shenandoah Valley and denying all its supplies to Lee's forces.

At the opening of the Overland Campaign in May, 1864, the 50th was again divided, one detachment assigned to the II Corps, one to the V Corps, and one to the VI Corps, one company remaining in Washington. The campaign kept the 50th, now commanded by LTC Ira Spaulding, constantly busy. By this point of the war, it was a seasoned, efficient regiment of engineers. Through continual recruitment, its eleven companies were organized into four battalions, with 40 officers and 1,500 enlisted men. The engineers in the AoP were organized into a Volunteer Engineer brigade (Note: Per Person, Benham’s Volunteer Engineer Brigade, like the Regular battalion, had served with the Army of the Potomac since late 1861. It was a seasoned unit of volunteers, originally consisting of the 50th and the 15th New York Volunteer engineer regiments. Soon after Chancellorsville in May 1863, most of the 15th New York mustered out of service after their two-year enlistments expired. Its few remaining companies, composed of three-year enlistees, were detailed to behind-the-lines duties.) consisting of the 50th and the 15th New York Volunteer Engineers and a battalion of regulars in four companies. (Note: These regulars were CAPT George H. Mendell’s United States Engineer Battalion.) These special troops had already accomplished much since the beginning of the campaign, erecting 38 pontoon bridges with an aggregate length of 6,458 feet. Of note, To expedite the evacuation of wounded from the Battle of the Wilderness, three Companies made a forced march to Fredericksburg on May 10, starting at 11:30. On arrival, they built bridge over the Rappahannock at Fredericksburg Lower Crossing, having it completed and ready for use at 16:30, having marched eight miles and built bridge 420 feet long in 5 hours.

==== Bridging the James ====
Grant realized he was again in a stalemate with Lee and additional assaults at Cold Harbor were not the answer. He planned three actions to make some headway. First, in the Shenandoah Valley, MGEN David Hunter was making progress against Confederate forces, and Grant hoped that by interdicting Lee's supplies, Lee would send reinforcements to the Valley. Second, on June 7 Grant sent Sheridan with the cavalry to destroy the Virginia Central Railroad near Charlottesville. Third, he planned a stealthy operation to withdraw from Lee's front and move across the James River. He planned to cross to the south bank of the river, bypassing Richmond, and isolate the capital by seizing the railroad junction of Petersburg to the south.

Lee reacted to the first two actions as Grant had hoped, sending Breckinridge's division from Cold Harbor and toward Lynchburg against Hunter following on June 12 assigning Jubal Early permanent command of the Second Corps and sending them to the Valley as well. He also two of his three cavalry divisions in pursuit of Sheridan, leading to the Battle of Trevilian Station.

For his third act, he would need to maneuver around Lee's left flank. Grant's complex plan was a coordinated effort between MGEN Meade's AoP Butler's AoJ. Army engineers would play a vital role. (Note: Benham and most of the 15th New York were Washington at the beginning of the campaign and shifted to Fort Monroe on April 15, to act as the engineer base for Grant who had told him to gather water transports sufficient to tow enough bridge-building materials to span the James. The AoJ'ss engineers were eight companies of the 1st New York Volunteer Engineer Regiment, commanded by Colonel Edward W. Serrell.) His plan was to send AoJ's XVII Corps (Note: Commanded by MGEN “Baldy” Smith, it had been reinfoced AoP and was in the lines at Cold Harbor.) from White House Landing on the Pamunkey, steam 150 miles around the James Peninsula, and lead the attack on Petersburg from Bermuda Hundred. II Corps would cross the James further downstream at a place giving them the shortest line of march while staying out of Lee's reach.

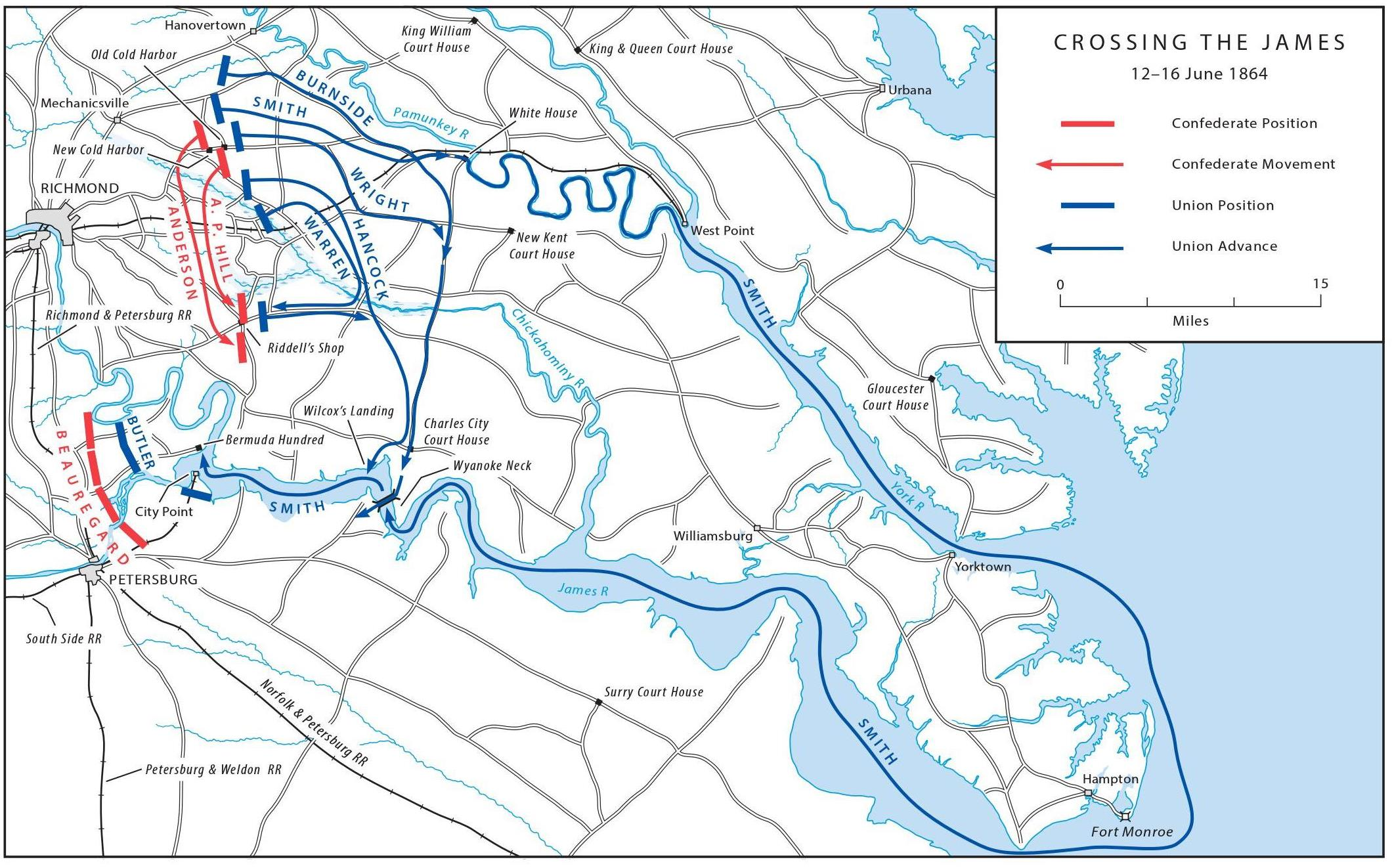
Crossing the James River, 12–16 June 1864.

Grant delegated the planning to Meade who had his chief of staff, MGEN Humphreys draft the operations order. The AoP would leave the lines at Cold Harbor in four coordinated columns. To start, Hancock's II and Warren's V Corps would cross the Chickahominy River at Long Bridge. The men of the 50th would play a key role in putting a 1,200-foot-long pontoon bridge across it. Due to the marshy ground leading to the bridgehead, the 50th would also build corduroy approaches.

V Corps would be the first in line and once across, they would turn west to screen and block reinforced by Wilson's 3rd Cavalry Division, which did not accompany Sheridan on his raid. This was also intended to make Lee think that Grant would make an advance on Richmond north of the James. At the same time, Wright's VI and Burnside's IX Corps would pull out and take separate routes to Jones’ Bridge on the Chickahominy River continuing on to Charles City Court House. BGEN Ferrero's division of United States Colored Troops would take a third column with the army's trains across the Chickahominy east of Jones’ Bridge.

On Thursday, June 9, Meade ordered the construction of a new line of entrenchments in the army's rear, extending northward from Elder Swamp to Allen's Mill Pond. On June 11, Saturday, the construction was complete and he issued orders for a movement to the James River, beginning after dark on June 12. (Note: Also on June 11, Lee ordered Early's Second Corps to depart for Charlottesville, likewise on June 12.)

On Sunday morning, Butler's chief engineer, BGEN Weitzel (Note: Witzel had graduated 2nd in the USMA class of 1855 behind his roommate, Cyrus Comstock, who was his counterpart at the AoP.) had sent Lieutenant Peter S. Michie to select a crossing site near Fort Powhatan. He chose Wilcox Landing, three-quarters of a mile upriver from the fort as a ferry site and Weyanoke Point and Windmill Point at Flowerdew Hundred, three miles downstream, for the bridgehead . The engineers would have their work cut out for them as the river was 1,992 feet at that point and the landward approach would needed considerable tree clearage and an extensive trestle ramp. Michie also chose an entrenched bridgehead position to cover the crossing sites.

The 50th had completed the bridge across the Chickahominy at Jones’ Bridge on Sunday morning, and the Engineer Battalion moved out at 17:00, crossing first. On the far side, they awaited the passage of VI Corps and then marched into camp at Charles City Court House, where they made camp leaving a detachment of the 50th at the bridge.

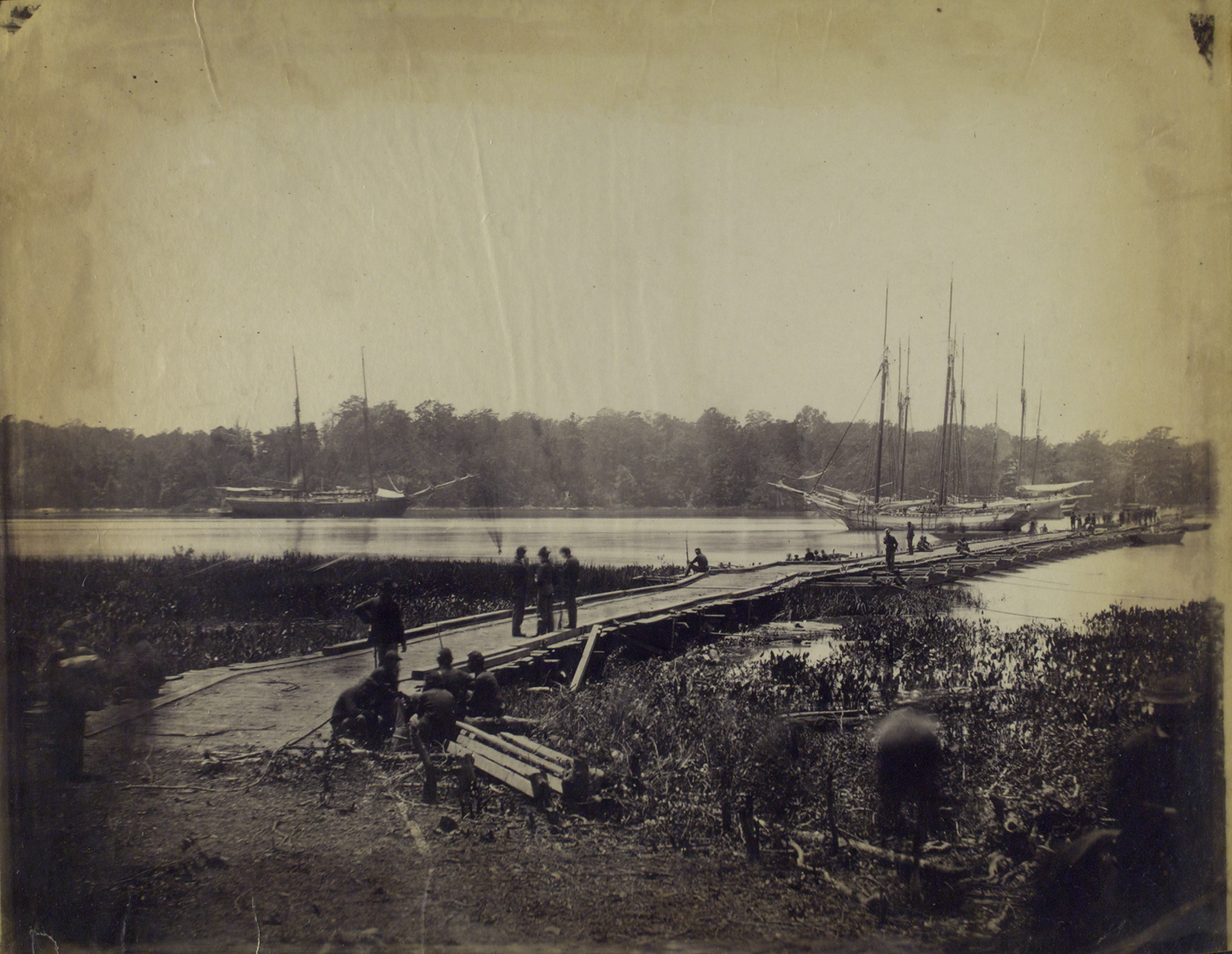
Pontoon bridge across the James River

As darkness fell on Sunday, II and VI Corps took up positions on the new entrenchment line. V Corps cleared the roads heading south, advancing over Long Bridge and White Oak Swamp Bridge, taking up a blocking position just east of Riddell's Shop, facing toward Richmond while IX Corps and Smith's XVIII Corps withdrew from the original line of entrenchments. COL George H. Chapman's brigade from 3rd Cavalry Division screened the roads heading toward Richmond. Burnside headed south, followed by Wright and Hancock. XVIII Corps marched to White House, where on the morning of June 13 they embarked on steamers for Bermuda Hundred. They arrived at Point of Rocks on the Appomattox River the night of June 14.

Most of the three infantry corps began ferrying across the James at Wilcox Landing on the morning of June 14. The engineers moved out at 11:00 from Charles City Court House stopping at Weyanoke Point for lunch at 14:00. Companies B, F, and G under MAJ Brainerd were sent to the Wilcox Landing ferry site to repair the wharves. Later that evening, he was ordered across the river to Windmill Point to construct an additional wharf for the use of follow-on troops.

At 15:00, the rest of AoP's engineers fell in without arms and went a short distance down the bank to meet Weitzel and their AoJ counterparts, the 1st New York. They found no work had been done and in a SNAFU, the pontoon material which had been sent to Bermuda Hundred in early June, had been sent back to Forts Monroe on Sunday. The equipment would not be back to Weyanoke Point until the next day. The engineers did not wait; they went right to work and within an hour built a 150-foot long abutment of trestle through the soft marshes—arguably the hardest part of the entire project. The battalion then went across the river to work on the opposite shore, with volunteers taking up the work at Weyanoke Point.

Benham arrived around noon from Fort Monroe with portions of the 15th New York and bridge materials in tow. The detachment bridge train of the 50th New York soon arrived. Benham took charge of the construction. Work started at 16:00 on June 15 and was completed seven hours later. As they could be unloaded from the vessels, the materials were made into “rafts” of six pontoon boats and rowed into position. While Lee remained unaware of Grant's intentions, the engineers constructed the longest pontoon bridge of the war. Upon completion, it stretched 2,200 feet (670 m) over deep water, across the James from Weyanoke to Windmill Points. Although most of Grant's infantry crossed the river by boats, IX Corps, one division of VI Corps, the animals and supply wagons, and a part of the artillery crossed on the bridge on June 15 and 16. By Friday morning, June 17, more than 100,000 men, 5,000 wagons and ambulances, 56,000 horses and mules, and 2,800 head of cattle had crossed the river without alerting the Confederates. Before the entire army had crossed, Smith's XVIII Corps, followed by Hancock's II Corps, became engaged in the next campaign, Richmond–Petersburg (the siege of Petersburg), with attacks on Petersburg on June 15.

=== 1865 ===
At Petersburg the regiment was in demand at all points for work of construction and repair on the fortifications, and it also assisted in destroying railroads.

During its long service the men became very proficient in engineering and through its steadiness under fire is said to have lost during the last year of its service no bridge material of any kind. The original members not reenlisted were mustered out at New York in Sept., 1864, and after participation in the grand review at Washington, the veteran organization was there mustered out on June 13–14, 1865.

== Affiliations, battle honors, detailed service, and casualties ==
=== Organizational affiliation ===
Attached to:

- Woodbury's Brigade. AoP, to April, 1862
- Engineer Brigade, AoP, to June, 1865.

=== List of battles ===
The official list of battles in which the regiment bore a part:

- Siege of Yorktown
- Seven Days Battles
- Battle of Malvern Hill
- Battle of Fredericksburg
- Pollock's Mill Creek
- Battle of Chancellorsville
- Second Battle of Fredericksburg
- Bank's Ford
- Battle of Deep Run
- Battle of Gettysburg
- Mine Run Campaign
- Battle of the Wilderness
- Battle of Spotsylvania Court House
- Battle of North Anna
- Battle of Totopotomoy Creek
- Battle of Cold Harbor
- Second Battle of Petersburg
- Battle of Jerusalem Plank Road
- First Battle of Deep Bottom
- Battle of Hatcher's Run
- Battle of White Oak Road
- Fall of Petersburg
- Battle of Appomattox Court House

=== Detailed service ===
==== 1861 ====
- Left New York for Washington, D.C., Sept 21.
- Duty at Alexandria, Va., until October
- Converted by special orders from the war department into a regiment of engineers and ordered to Wash- ington, where instruction was received.
- Duty at Washington, D.C., until March 18, 1862

==== 1862 ====
- Moved with Army of the Potomac to the Virginia Peninsula.
- Siege of Yorktown April 5-May 4.
- Advance up the Peninsula and constructing bridges on the Chickahominy River May.
- Battle of Fair Oaks, Seven Pines, May 31-June 1.
- Seven days before Richmond June 25-July 1.
  - Battle of Seven Pines June 27.
  - White Oak Swamp and Charles City Cross Roads June 30.
  - Malvern Hill July 1.
- At Harrison's Landing until August 16.
- Moved to Washington, D.C., August 16–22.
- Maryland Campaign September–October.
  - Operating at and about Harper's Ferry, W. Va., and Berlin, Md., during and after the battle of Antietam.
  - Threw two pontoon bridges over the Potomac River at Berlin, Md., for the crossing the Army of the Potomac in their pursuit of Lee from Antietam.
- Rappahannock Campaign November, 1862, to June, 1863.
- Battle of Fredericksburg December 11–15. (Construction of three pontoon bridges for Sumner's Grand Division)
- Duty at Falmouth, Va., until April 1863.

==== 1863 ====
- "Mud March" January 20–24, 1863.
- Chancellorsville Campaign April 27-May 6.
  - Operations at Franklin's Crossing April 29-May 2.
  - Maryes Heights, Fredericksburg, May 3.
  - Salem Heights May 3–4.
  - Banks' Ford May 4.
- Operations at Deep Run Ravine June 5 13.
- Gettysburg Campaign June 13-July 24.
- Battle of Gettysburg July 1–4.
- Bristoe Campaign October 9–22.
- Bristoe Station October 14.
- Advance to line of the Rappahannock November 7–8.
- Mine Run Campaign November 26-December 2.

==== 1864 ====
- Campaign from the Rapidan to the James May 3-June 15
- Laid all bridges for Army of the Potomac during the Campaign. Battles of the Wilderness May 5–7
- Spottsylvania Court House May 8–21.
- To expedite the transportation of wounded three Companies made a forced march to Fredericksburg on May 10, starting at 11:30 a.m. Built bridge over the Rappahannock at Fredericksburg Lower Crossing, having it completed and ready for use at 4:30 p.m., having marched 8 miles and built bridge 420 feet long in 5 hours.
- North Anna River May 23–26.
- On line of the Pamunkey May 26–28.
- On line of the Totopotomoy May 28–31.
- About Cold Harbor June 1–12.
- Crossing of James River June 15.
- Before Petersburg June 16–18.
- Siege operations against Petersburg and Richmond June, 1864, to April, 1865.
- Jerusalem Plank Road June 22–23, 1864.
- Demonstration on north side of James River July 27–29.
- Deep Bottom July 27–28.

==== 1865 ====
- Hatcher's Run, February 5–7, 1865.
- Appomattox Campaign March 28-April 9.
- Fall of Petersburg April 2.
- Appomattox Court House April 9. Surrender of Lee and his army.
- (Co. "I" march to Danville with 6th Army Corps April 23–27.
- Mustered out at Washington, DC, June 13, 1865.

== Casualties ==
The loss of the regiment during its service was, killed in action, 1 officer, 9 enlisted men; of wounds received in action, 7 enlisted men; of disease and other causes, 1 officer, 213 enlisted men; total, 2 officers, 229 enlisted men; aggregate, 231; of whom 1 enlisted man died in the hands of the enemy.

== Armament ==
Since the men of the 50th were specialists, they were not given first-tier weapons. They were armed with 872 Model 1822 Muskets. By the first quarter of 1863, after an effort to get most of the companies to be armed with the same weapon to make supply easier, the regiment reported the following survey:

- A — 54 Austrian Lorenz Rifled Muskets, leaf and block sights, Quadrangular bayonet (.54 Cal) (Note: The Lorenz rifle was the third most widely used rifle during the American Civil War. The Union recorded purchases of 226,924. Its quality was inconsistent. Some were considered to be of the finest quality (particularly ones from the Vienna Arsenal), and were sometimes praised as being superior to the Enfield; others, especially those in later purchases from private contractors, were described as horrible in both design and condition. Lorenz rifles in the Civil War were generally used with .54 caliber cartridges designed for the Model 1841 "Mississippi" rifle. These differed from the cartridges manufactured in Austria and may have contributed to the unreliability of the weapons. Many of the rifles were bored out to .58 caliber to accommodate standard Springfield rifle ammunition.), leaf and block sights, Quadrangular bayonet (.54 and .55 Cal)
- B — 75 Austrian Lorenz Rifled Muskets, leaf and block sights, Quadrangular bayonet (.54 and .55 Cal)
- C — 106 Austrian Lorenz Rifled Muskets, leaf and block sights, Quadrangular bayonet (.54 and .55 Cal)
- D — 57 Austrian Lorenz Rifled Muskets, leaf and block sights, Quadrangular bayonet (.54 and .55 Cal)
- E — 104 Austrian Lorenz Rifled Muskets, leaf and block sights, Quadrangular bayonet (.54 and .55 Cal)
- F — 8 model 1855, 1861, National Armory (NA) (Note: In government records, National Armory refers to one of three United States Armory and Arsenals, the Springfield Armory, the Harpers Ferry Armory, and the Rock Island Arsenal. Rifle-muskets, muskets, and rifles were manufactured in Springfield and Harper's Ferry before the war. When the Rebels destroyed the Harpers Ferry Armory early in the American Civil War and stole the machinery for the Confederate central government-run Richmond Armory, the Springfield Armory was briefly the only government manufacturer of arms, until the Rock Island Arsenal was established in 1862. During this time production ramped up to unprecedented levels ever seen in American manufacturing up until that time, with only 9,601 rifles manufactured in 1860, rising to a peak of 276,200 by 1864. These advancements would not only give the Union a decisive technological advantage over the Confederacy during the war but served as a precursor to the mass production manufacturing that contributed to the post-war Second Industrial Revolution and 20th century machine manufacturing capabilities. American historian Merritt Roe Smith has drawn comparisons between the early assembly machining of the Springfield rifles and the later production of the Ford Model T, with the latter having considerably more parts, but producing a similar numbers of units in the earliest years of the 1913–1915 automobile assembly line, indirectly due to mass production manufacturing advancements pioneered by the armory 50 years earlier.); 119 Austrian Lorenz Rifled Muskets, leaf and block sights, Quadrangular bayonet (.54 and .55 Cal)
- G — 95 Austrian Lorenz Rifled Muskets, leaf and block sights, Quadrangular bayonet (.54 and .55 Cal)
- H — 123 Austrian Lorenz Rifled Muskets, leaf and block sights, Quadrangular bayonet (.54 and .55 Cal)
- I — 85 Austrian Lorenz Rifled Muskets, leaf and block sights, Quadrangular bayonet (.54 and .55 Cal)
- K — 52 Austrian Lorenz Rifled Muskets, leaf and block sights, Quadrangular bayonet (.54 and .55 Cal)

=== Rifle-muskets ===
Issued weapons

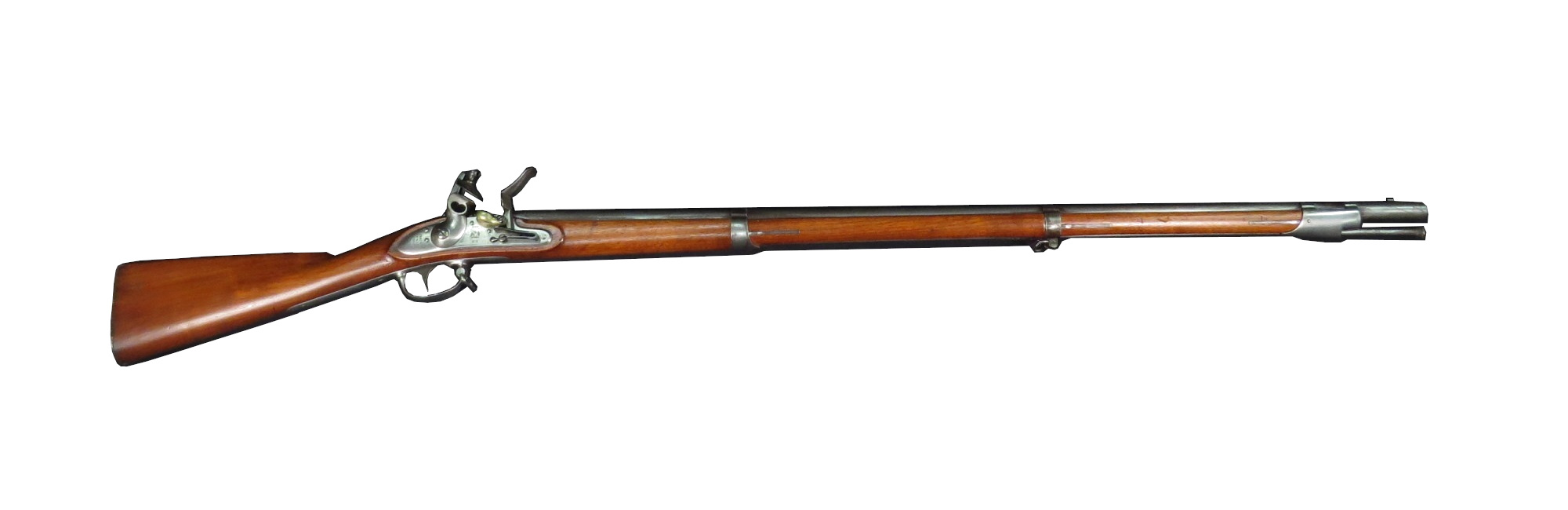
Model 1822 Flintlock smoothbore musket

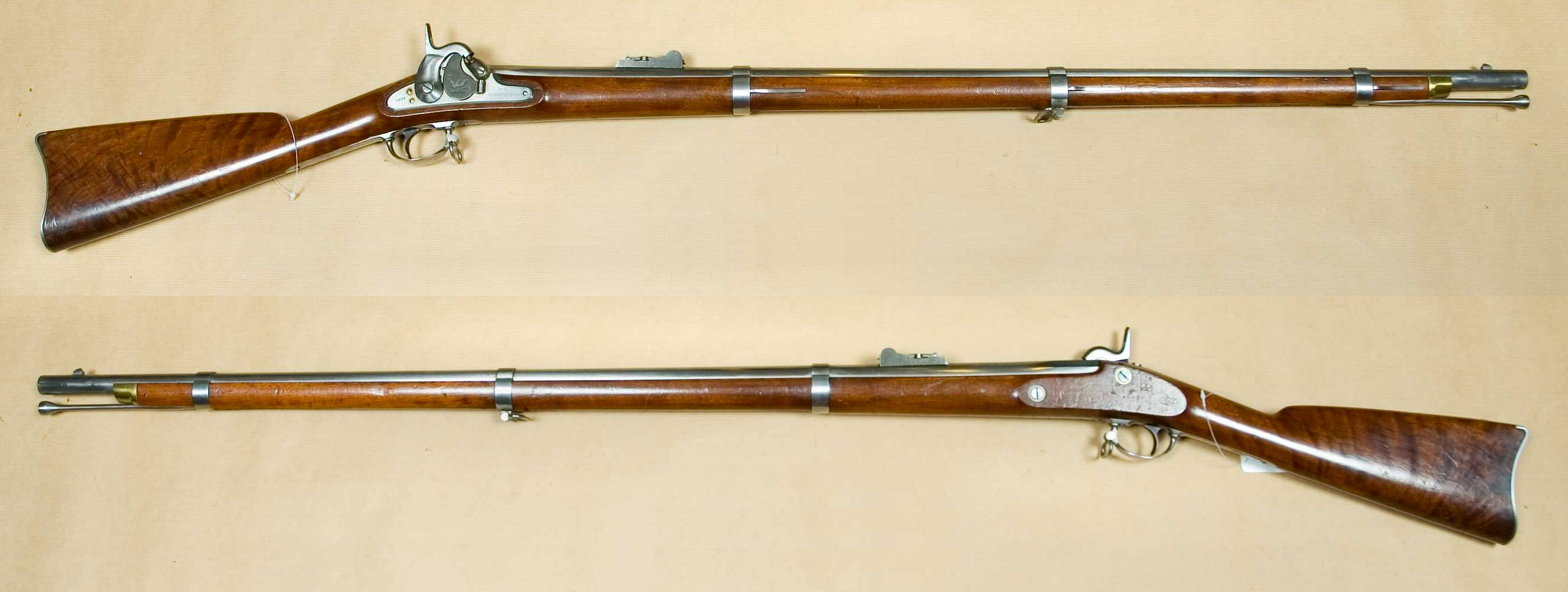
Springfield Model 1855

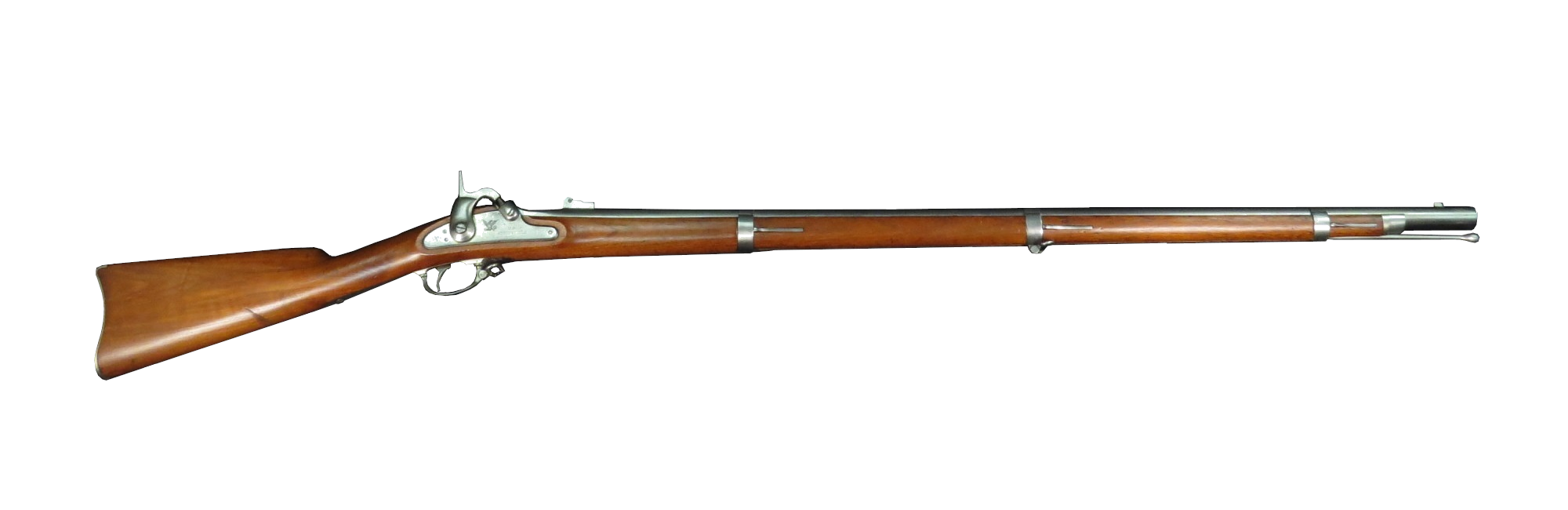
Springfield Model 1861

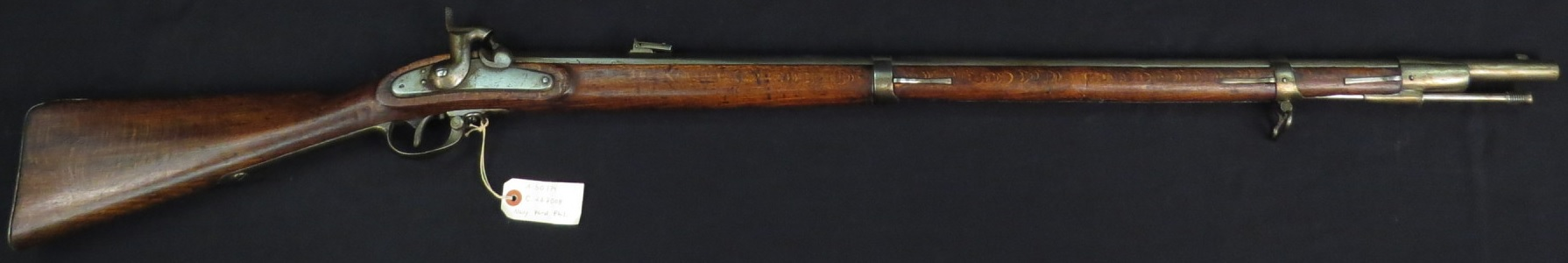
Lorenz Rifle Model 1854

== See also ==
- List of New York Civil War regiments
- New York in the Civil War
