= William Watts Folwell =

American historian and writer (1833–1929)

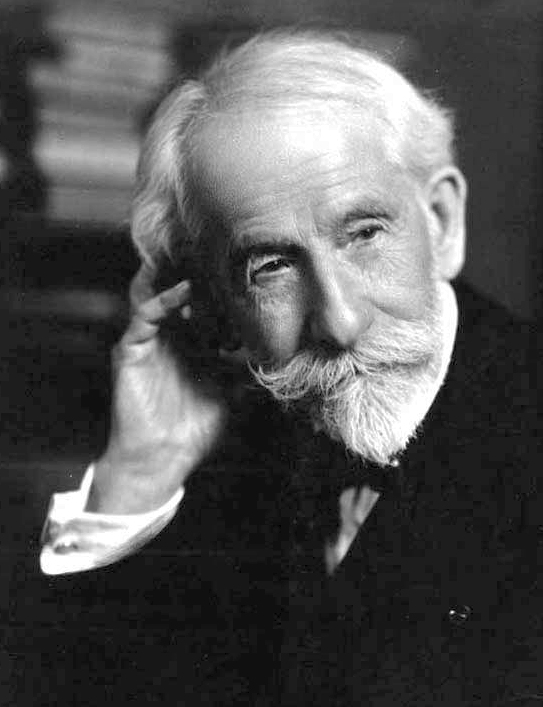

1st President of the University of Minnesota
- In office 1869–1884
- Succeeded by: Cyrus Northrop

Personal details
- Born: February 14, 1833 Romulus, New York, US
- Died: September 17, 1929 (aged 96) Minneapolis, Minnesota, US

William Watts Folwell (February 14, 1833 – September 17, 1929) was an educator, writer and historian who was the first president of the University of Minnesota.

== Biography ==
Folwell was born in 1833 in Romulus, New York. He attended Hobart College in Geneva, New York, where he received his undergraduate degree in 1857. Folwell was a member of Alpha Delta Phi fraternity at Hobart. In 1859, he became adjunct professor of mathematics there, and received a Master of Arts degree in 1860. He spent the years 1860–1861 in the study of philology at Berlin and in travel. During the American Civil War, he served in the 50th New York Volunteer Engineer Regiment where he received the rank of brevet lieutenant colonel of engineers.

After the Civil War, Folwell briefly engaged in business pursuits in Ohio and accepted a position as the chair of mathematics at Kenyon College, Ohio for a year. In 1869, he became the University of Minnesota's first president. When he first assumed the presidency, the university consisted of just eight faculty members and 100 students in a single building. He laid out a plan for the university to expand beyond traditional undergraduate education to include postgraduate education and professional programs as well as cultural facilities such as museums and libraries. Folwell's plans caused some tension with more traditional faculty, leading to resignations in 1879 and an end to his presidency in 1884. Folwell continued to serve the university as the chair of the school's political science department and as the university's librarian until 1907. After retiring the university named a new building Folwell Hall in his honor.

Folwell was also a major advocate for parks in Minneapolis, serving on the city's park board from 1889 to 1907 and as the board's president from 1895 to 1903. He supported Horace Cleveland's vision of a network of parks crossing the city and also suggested the term "Grand Rounds" to describe it. Today the Folwell, Minneapolis neighborhood and Folwell Park within it are named for him as was William Watts Folwell Junior High (later Middle) School, a south Minneapolis public school that was open from 1931 to 2010 (converted to the current Folwell Performing Arts, a public pre-K through 8 facility).

Folwell was president of the Minnesota Historical Society from 1924 to 1927. His comprehensive four-volume "A History of Minnesota," first published in the 1920s, was still in print from the Minnesota Historical Society Press a century later.

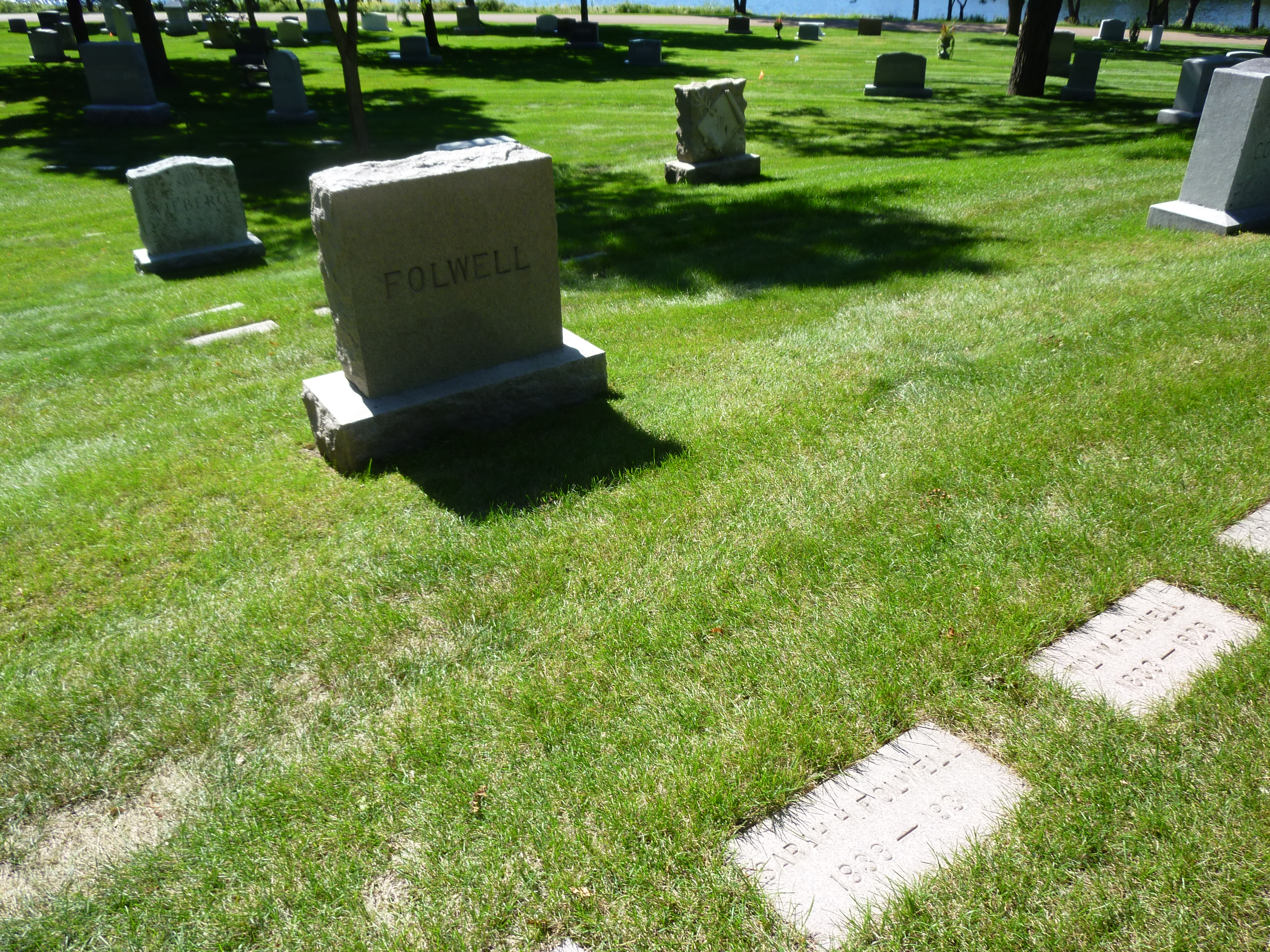
Folwell's grave at Lakewood Cemetery in Minneapolis

Folwell died in 1929. He is buried in Lakewood Cemetery in Minneapolis.

== Publications ==
Books written by Folwell:

- Folwell, William Watts (1908). Minnesota, the North Star State. Boston; New York: Houghton Mifflin Co. OCLC 409032.
- Folwell, William Watts (1909). University Addresses. Minneapolis: H.W. Wilson. OCLC 6362596.
- Folwell, William Watts (1918). Economic Addresses. Minneapolis: University of Minnesota. OCLC 6389162.
- Folwell, William Watts (1921–1930). A History of Minnesota. St. Paul, Minn.: Minnesota Historical Society. OCLC 376916.
- Folwell, William Watts; Buck, Solon J. (1933). William Watts Folwell; The Autobiography and Letters of a Pioneer of Culture. Minneapolis: The University of Minnesota Press. OCLC 2287639.

=== Papers ===
Two collections of William Watts Folwell's papers are available for research use at the University Archives, University of Minnesota – Twin Cities. They include correspondence, civil war letters, genealogical correspondence, manuscripts by Folwell, newspaper clippings, and diaries by Folwell.

== See also ==
- List of presidents of the University of Minnesota

Academic offices
New title	1st President of the University of Minnesota; 1869–1884	Succeeded by Cyrus Northrop
