= Northrop (surname) =

Northrop is a surname. Notable people with the name include:

- Ann Northrop (born 1948), American journalist and activist
- Creig Northrop, American real estate agent and broker
- Cyrus Northrop (1834–1922), American university president
- Edward Skottowe Northrop (1911–2003), an American federal judge
- F. S. C. Northrop (1893–1992), American philosopher
- George C. Northrop (1819–1874), American politician and banker in Wisconsin
- Henry Davenport Northrop (1836–1909) American Presbyterian minister, and author
- Henry P. Northrop (1842–1916), American Roman Catholic bishop
- Jack Northrop (1895–1981), American aircraft industrialist and designer, founded the Northrop Corporation
- James Henry Northrop (1856–1940), English inventor
- John Howard Northrop (1891–1987), American biochemist
- Lucius B. Northrop (1811–1894), American Confederate States of America colonel
- Sandy Northrop, American television producer
- Wayne Northrop (1947–2024), American actor
