= Joseph Warren Beach =

American writer (1880–1957)

Joseph Warren Beach (January 14, 1880 – August 13, 1957) was an American poet, novelist, critic, educator and literary scholar.

== Life ==
Joseph Warren Beach was born in Gloversville, New York. His parents were Dr. Eugene Beach, who was a physician, and Sarah Jessup Warren Beach. Beach had been drawn to the University of Minnesota from Gloversville, by the school's president, his father-in-law, Cyrus Northrop. For teachers there, "he wrote his first poetry and his brilliant undergraduate papers," wrote University of Minnesota historian James Gray.

Following Beach's graduation from the University of Minnesota with a B.A. in 1900, he became an instructor in rhetoric. After earning his M.A. (1902) and Ph.D. (1907) at Harvard University, Beach returned to Minneapolis in 1907 to join the faculty of the department of English at the University of Minnesota. Starting as assistant professor, he became associate professor in 1917 and professor in 1924. Beach chaired the English department from 1940 to 1948, after which time he retired. William van O'Connor, noted critic and professor in the English department, wrote that at the time of his death Beach was "the most distinguished scholar" the department had ever had on its faculty.

After retirement from the University of Minnesota, Beach continued teaching until his death. He taught at Harvard University, the University of Illinois, the Sorbonne in Paris, the University of Strasbourg in Strasbourg, France, Johns Hopkins University and the University of Vienna in Vienna, Austria.

== Works ==
Beach was the author of a number of works of poetry, literary criticism, and fiction. He was one of the first academic scholars to work on literary figures such as Henry James (The Method of Henry James (1918)), George Meredith (The Comic Spirit in Meredith (1911)), and Thomas Hardy (The Technique of Thomas Hardy (1922)). Allen Tate called Beach's book on Henry James "a critical masterpiece, as its insights have not been replaced or improved upon to any great extent by later critics." Beach was also an authority on nineteenth-century literature, and especially British Romantic poetry. He published his magnum opus, The Concept of Nature in Nineteenth-Century English Poetry in 1936. Beach's The Making of the Auden Canon (1957) was a study of how W. H. Auden revised his earlier-published poems as his view of the world changed. His other books include The Outlook for American Prose (1926), American Fiction: 1920-1940 (1941), and Obsessive Images: Symbolism in Poetry of the 1930s and 1940s (1960).

Beach also brought out three volumes of his own poetry – Sonnets of the Head and Heart (1903), Beginning With Plato (1944), and Involuntary Witness (1950) – as well as one novel – Glass Mountain (1930) – and a book of short stories – Meek Americans (1925). His letters and papers are housed in the Library of Congress and at the University of Minnesota library.

== Family ==
By his first wife, Elisabeth Northrop (1871–1917, m. 1907), he had two sons, Northrop Beach (1912–2002) and Warren Beach (1914–1999). His second wife was the author Dagmar Doneghy (1888–1966), whom he married in 1918.
