= Rathbone, New York =

- Town
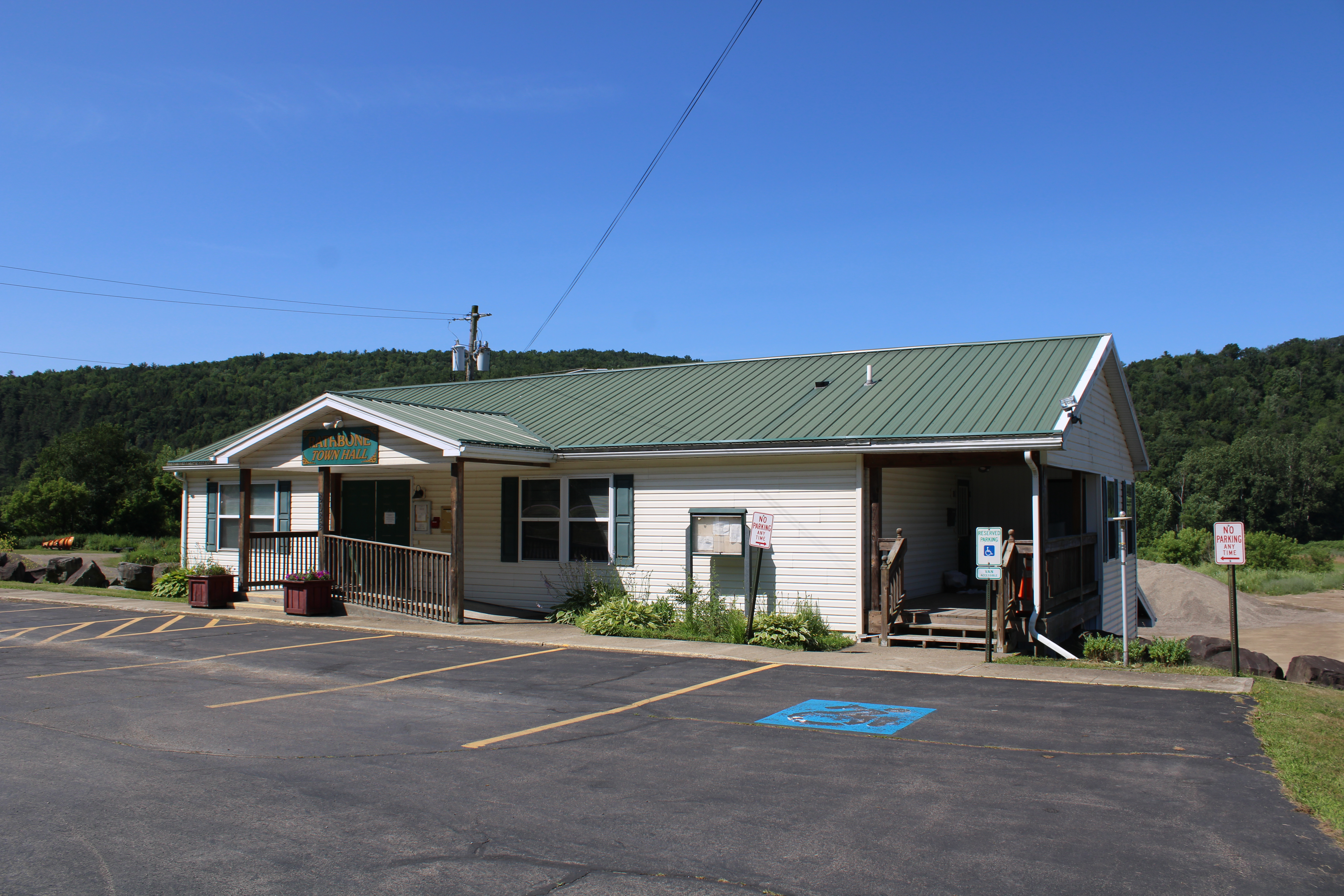
- Rathbone Town Hall

- Location within the state of New York Rathbone (the United States)
- Coordinates: 42°8′23″N 77°21′4″W
- Country: United States
- State: New York
- County: Steuben

Area
  - Total: 36.12 sq mi (93.55 km^{2})
  - Land: 36.02 sq mi (93.29 km^{2})
  - Water: 0.10 sq mi (0.26 km^{2})
- Elevation: 1,129 ft (344 m)

Population (2020)
  - Total: 1,095 ▼
  - Estimate (2021): 1,089
  - Density: 30.6/sq mi (11.83/km^{2})
- Time zone: UTC-5 (Eastern (EST))
  - Summer (DST): UTC-4 (EDT)
- FIPS code: 36-60653
- GNIS feature ID: 0979408
- Website: https://www.townofrathbone.com/

Rathbone is a town in Steuben County, New York, United States. The population was 1,095 as of the 2020 census. The name comes from early settler, General Ransom Rathbone.

The Town of Rathbone is in the southern part of the county, west of Corning.

== History ==
The town was first settled circa 1773, and was first settled by Americans in.

In 1804, the town had an inn, saw mill, grist mill, 2 blacksmiths, and a wagon shop. In 1842, General Ransom Rathbone settled in the area and would open the first shop in the town.

Rathbone was formed from parts of three other pre-existing towns: Addison, Cameron and Woodhull in 1856.

== Geography ==
According to the United States Census Bureau, the town has a total area of 36.12 square miles (93.6 km^{2}), of which 36.1 square miles (93 km^{2}) is land and 0.083% is water.

The Canisteo River flows through the town past the communities of Cameron Mills, Derby Switch, and Rathbone. County Road 119 follows the course of the river.

== Demographics ==
Historical population
Census	Pop.	Note	%±
1860	1,381		—
1870	1,357		−1.7%
1880	1,371		1.0%
1890	1,269		−7.4%
1900	1,059		−16.5%
1910	917		−13.4%
1920	761		−17.0%
1930	695		−8.7%
1940	699		0.6%
1950	741		6.0%
1960	726		−2.0%
1970	873		20.2%
1980	913		4.6%
1990	892		−2.3%
2000	1,080		21.1%
2010	1,126		4.3%
2020	1,095		−2.8%
2021 (est.)	1,089		−0.5%
U.S. Decennial Census

As of the census of 2000, there were 1,080 people, 307 households, and 291 families residing in the town. The population density was 29.9 inhabitants per square mile (11.5/km^{2}). There were 461 housing units at an average density of 12.8 per square mile (4.9/km^{2}). The racial makeup of the town was 98.06% White, 0.09% African American, 0.37% Native American, and 1.48% from two or more races. Hispanic or Latino of any race were 0.46% of the population.

There were 370 households, out of which 36.5% had children under the age of 18 living with them, 64.6% were married couples living together, 7.6% had a female householder with no husband present, and 21.4% were non-families. 14.3% of all households were made up of individuals, and 3.5% had someone living alone who was 65 years of age or older. The average household size was 2.92 and the average family size was 3.16.

In the town, the population was spread out, with 29.4% under the age of 18, 7.0% from 18 to 24, 28.8% from 25 to 44, 24.6% from 45 to 64, and 10.2% who were 65 years of age or older. The median age was 36 years. For every 100 females, there were 98.9 males. For every 100 females age 18 and over, there were 104.6 males.

The median income for a household in the town was $37,143, and the median income for a family was $35,000. Of full-time year-round workers, males had a median income of $25,875 versus $21,875 for females. The per capita income for the town was $13,102. About 13.2% of families and 20.2% of the population were below the poverty line, including 34.9% of those under age 18 and 10.0% of those age 65 or over.

== Communities and location in the Town of Rathbone ==
- Cameron Mills – A hamlet on the town line in the northwest part of the town. The Town Line Church and Cemetery was listed on the National Register of Historic Places in 2000.
- Derby Switch – A hamlet in the southeast part of the town.
- Rathbone – The hamlet of Rathbone on County Road 21. The Northrup Hill School District 10 was listed on the National Register of Historic Places in 1999.
- Tracy Creek – A tributary of the Canisteo River entering the river by Rathbone village.
