= Town Line Church and Cemetery =

Historic church in New York, United States

- U.S. National Register of Historic Places
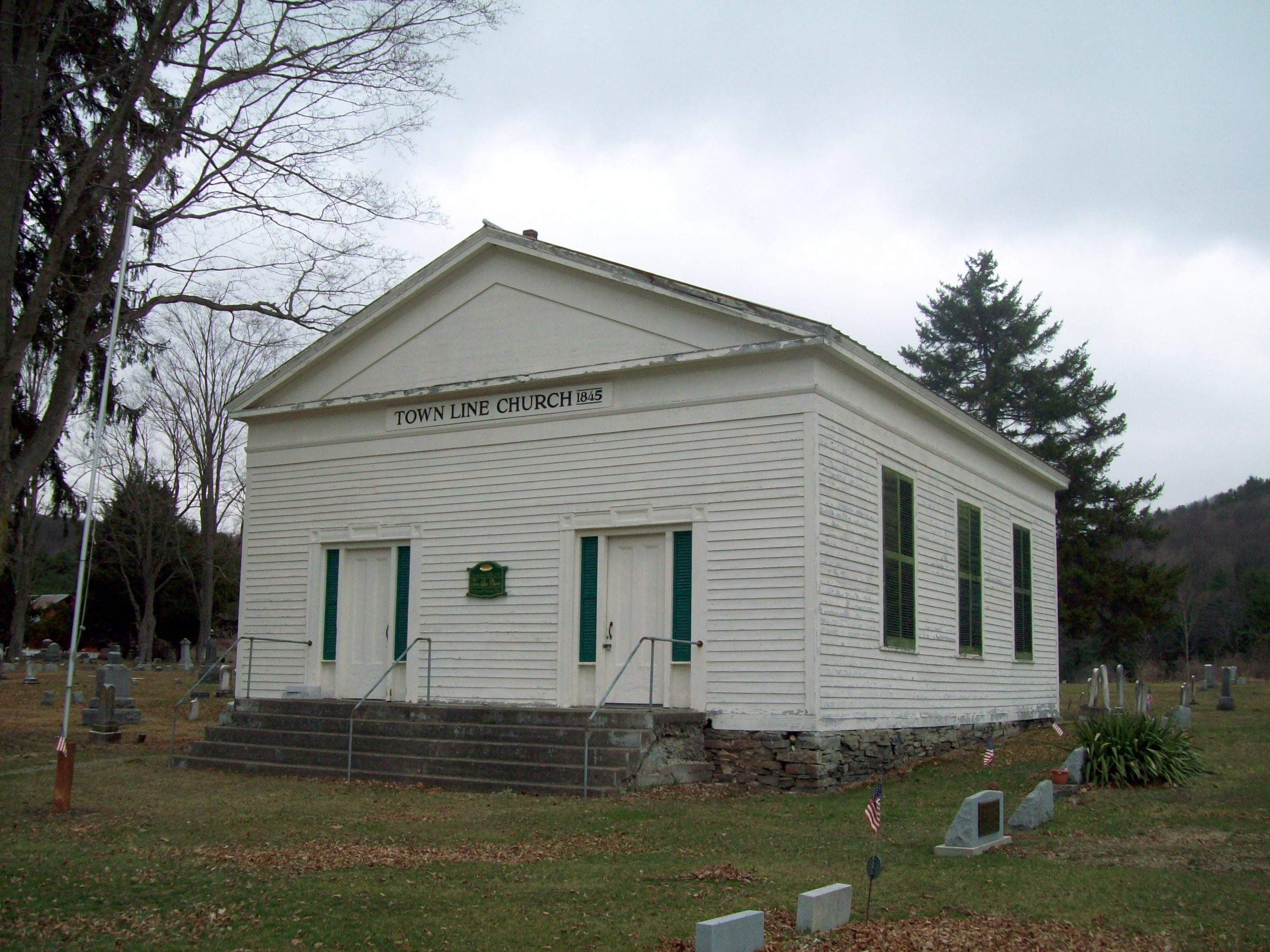
- Town Line Church, April 2011

- Location within New York Location within the United States
- Nearest city: Cameron Mills, New York
- Coordinates: 42°10′33″N 77°20′37″W
- Area: 4.3 acres (1.7 ha)
- Built: 1845
- Architectural style: Greek Revival
- NRHP reference No.: 00001317
- Added to NRHP: November 20, 2000

Town Line Church and Cemetery is a historic church and cemetery located at Cameron Mills in Steuben County, New York. It is a small frame building constructed in 1845 in a vernacular Greek Revival style. A cemetery surrounds the church and contains upwards of 3,030 burials with markers dating to the 1830s.

It was listed on the National Register of Historic Places in 2000.

== Gallery ==
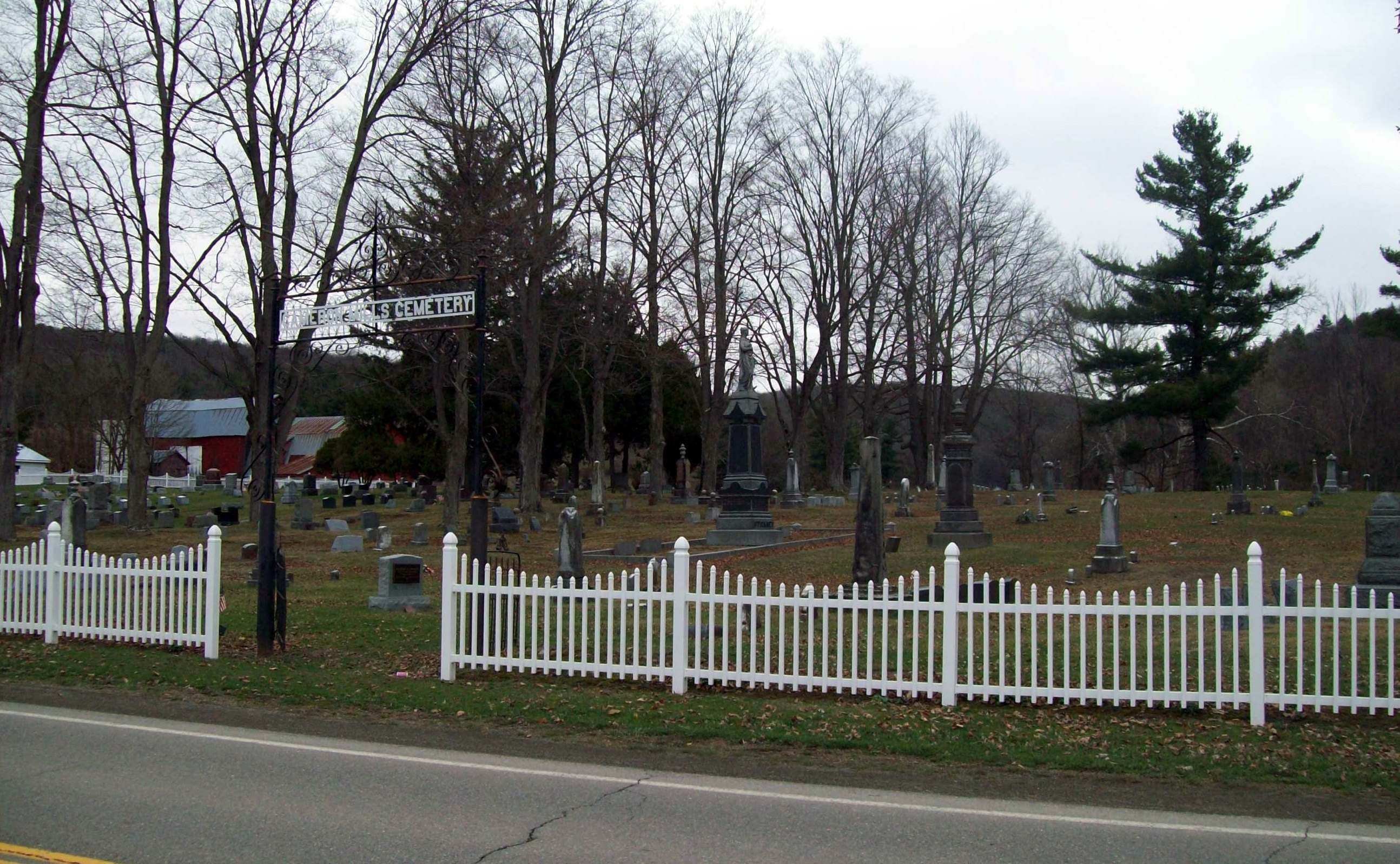
Town Line Church Cemetery, April 2011
