= George Edgar Vincent =

American sociologist and university president (1864–1941)

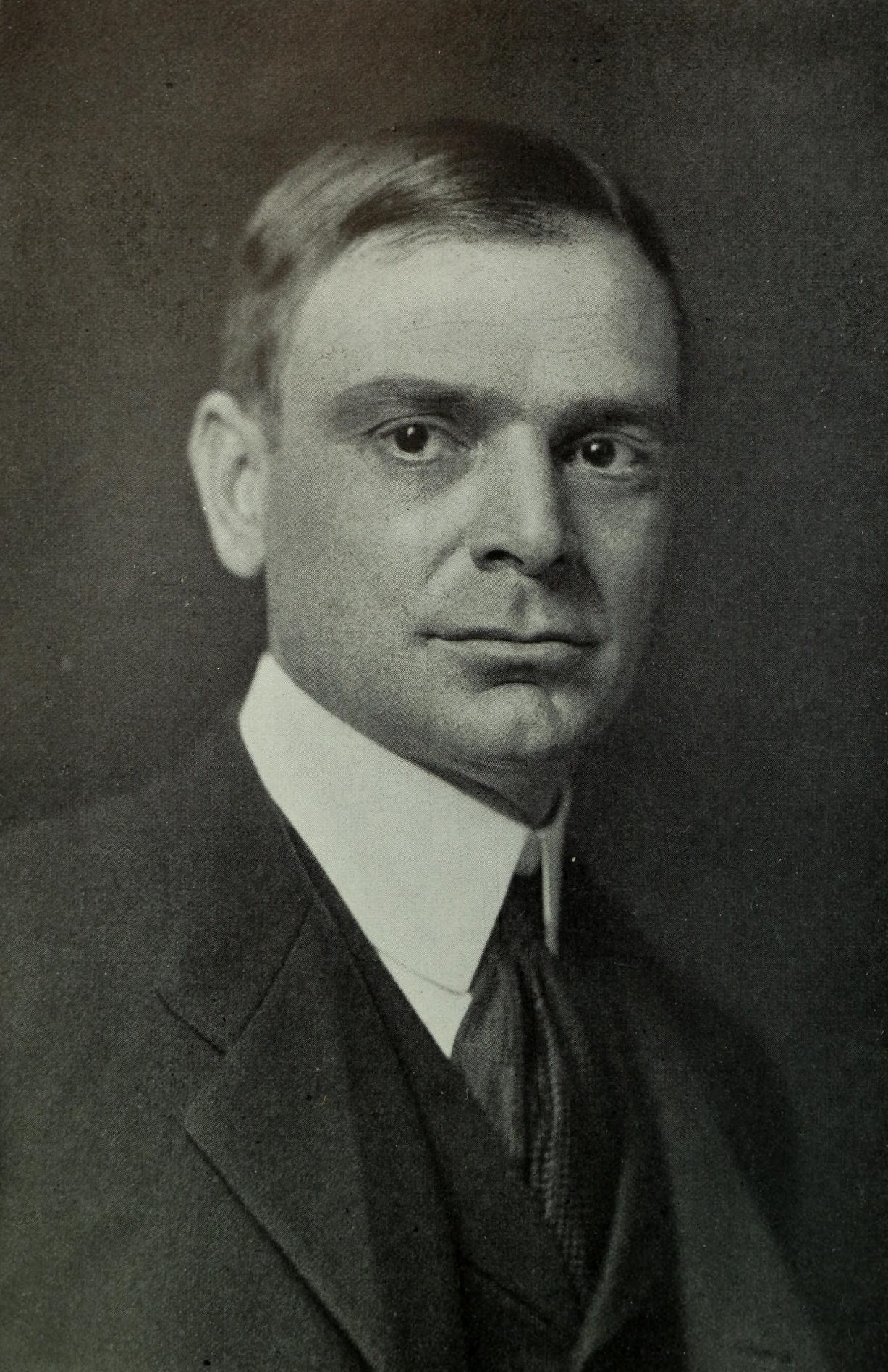

3rd President of the University of Minnesota
- In office 1911–1917
- Preceded by: Cyrus Northrop
- Succeeded by: Marion LeRoy Burton

Personal details
- Born: March 21, 1864 Rockford, Illinois; United States
- Died: February 1, 1941 (aged 76) New York City, New York; United States
- Spouse: Louise (Palmer) Vincent
- Children: John Henry Vincent; Isabel (Vincent) Harper; Elizabath (Vincent) Foster
- Parents: Bishop John Heyl Vincent; Elizabeth (Dusenbury) Vincent
- Education: Yale University
- Profession: Sociologist, Professor, University President
- Known for: Co-author of the first sociology textbook with Albion Small

George Edgar Vincent (March 21, 1864 – February 2, 1941) was an American sociologist and university president.

== Biography ==
He was born at Rockford, Illinois, the son of Bishop John H. Vincent. He studied at Yale, where he was a member of Delta Kappa Epsilon fraternity and served on the thirteenth editorial board of The Yale Record. After graduating in 1885, he engaged in journalistic and literary work.

In 1888 he became associated with the Chautauqua system as vice principal, and after 1907 was president of the Chautauqua Institution (of the Chautauqua movement).

From 1892 to 1894 he was a fellow at the University of Chicago, in the first Department of Sociology in the United States. He was appointed to the Chicago faculty in 1894 and became a professor of sociology in 1904. From 1900 to 1907 he was dean of the junior colleges, and from 1907 to 1911 he was dean of the faculties of arts, literature, and science.

In 1911 he became the third president of the University of Minnesota in Minneapolis/Saint Paul, Minnesota. Drawing on his experience with the Chautauqua Institute, he helped found the General Extension Division (the predecessor of the College of Continuing Education) to provide working adults with access to the university's courses. While at the U of MN, Vincent put in place innovative programming including 'University Weeks' with plays, lectures, concerts and debates similar to the Chautauqua Institute, in the spirit of increasing educational and cultural opportunities for the general public.

Vincent Hall on the University of Minnesota's East Bank campus is named in his honor. Vincent Hall is home to the School of Mathematics.

In 1917 he took the position of president of the Rockefeller Foundation. During the 1st year of his presidency he chaired an executive committee consisting of himself with 4 other members: Wallace Buttrick, Simon Flexner, Starr J. Murphy, and Wickliffe Rose.

== Works ==
- An Introduction to the Study of Society (1894) with Albion W. Small, the first sociology textbook
- The Social Mind and Education (1896)
- The National Memory (1913)

Academic offices
Preceded by Edward A. Ross	President of the American Sociological Association; 1915–1916	Succeeded by George E. Howard
Preceded by Cyrus Northrop	President of the University of Minnesota; 1911–1917	Succeeded by Marion LeRoy Burton
Non-profit organization positions
Preceded by John D. Rockefeller Jr.	President of the Rockefeller Foundation; November 6, 1917 – September 20, 1929	Succeeded by Max Mason
