= Northrop, Minnesota =

City in Minnesota, United States

- City
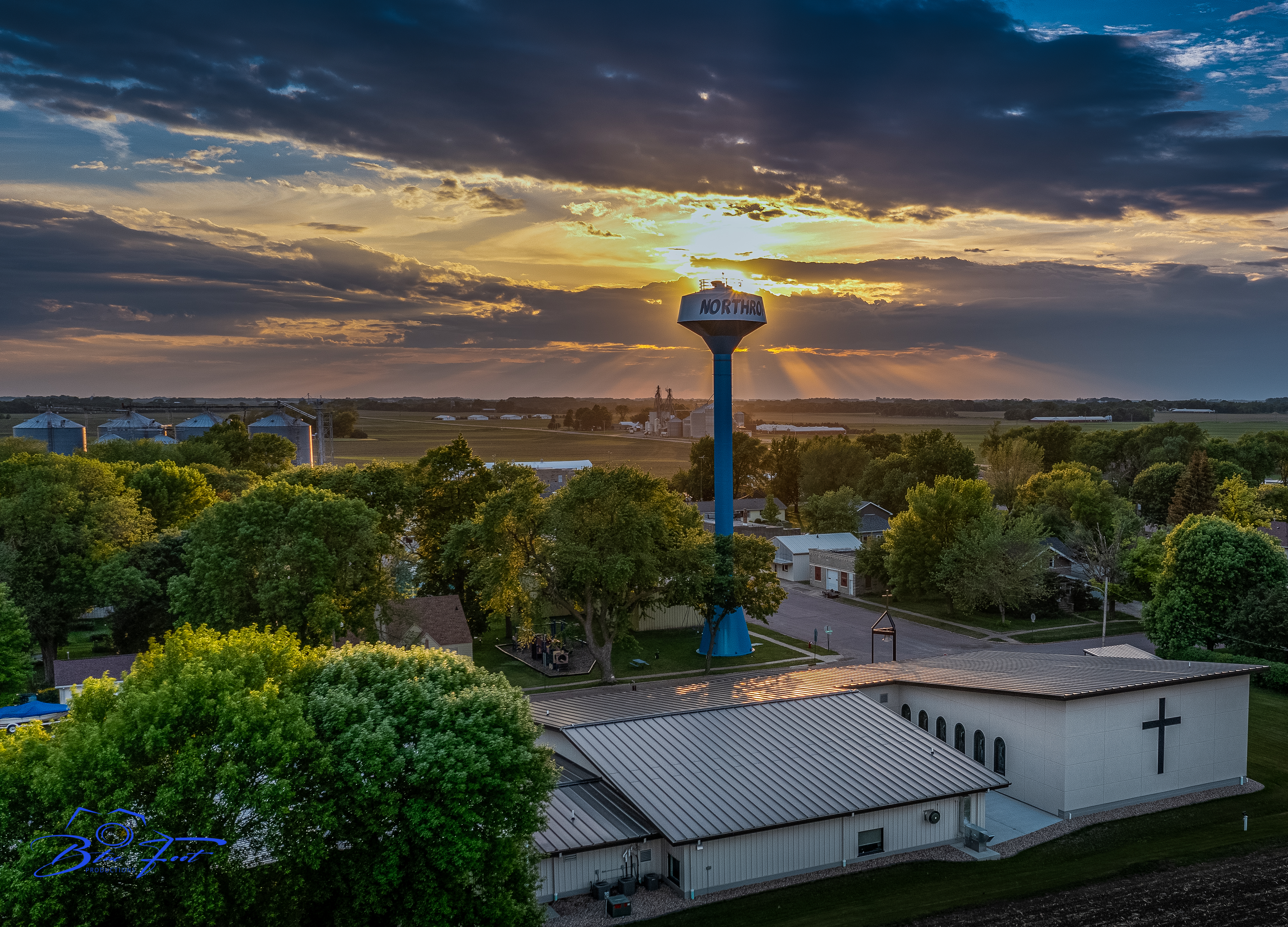
- Northrop in 2021

- Location in Martin County and state of Minnesota
- Coordinates: 43°44′09″N 94°26′12″W
- Country: United States
- State: Minnesota
- County: Martin

Area
  - Total: 0.13 sq mi (0.34 km^{2})
  - Land: 0.13 sq mi (0.34 km^{2})
  - Water: 0 sq mi (0.00 km^{2})
- Elevation: 1,145 ft (349 m)

Population (2020)
  - Total: 223
  - Density: 1,707.9/sq mi (659.41/km^{2})
- Time zone: UTC-6 (Central (CST))
  - Summer (DST): UTC-5 (CDT)
- ZIP code: 56075
- Area code: 507
- FIPS code: 27-47212
- GNIS feature ID: 2395269

Northrop is a city in Martin County, Minnesota, United States. The population was 223 at the 2020 census.

== History ==
Northrop was platted in 1899. It was named for Cyrus Northrop, president of the University of Minnesota. A post office was established at Northrop in 1900, and remained in operation until it was discontinued in 1972.

== Geography ==
Northrop is in northeastern Martin County, 7 miles (11 km) north of Fairmont, the county seat, and the same distance south of Truman. Minnesota State Highway 15 passes half a mile east of Northrop, connecting it with Fairmont and Truman.

According to the U.S. Census Bureau, Northrop has a total area of 0.13 square miles (0.34 km^{2}), all land.

== Demographics ==
Historical population
Census	Pop.	Note	%±
1940	134		—
1950	157		17.2%
1960	189		20.4%
1970	188		−0.5%
1980	269		43.1%
1990	276		2.6%
2000	262		−5.1%
2010	227		−13.4%
2020	223		−1.8%
U.S. Decennial Census

=== 2010 census ===
As of the census of 2010, there were 227 people, 104 households, and 64 families living in the city. The population density was 1,513.3 inhabitants per square mile (584.3/km^{2}). There were 111 housing units at an average density of 740.0 per square mile (285.7/km^{2}). The racial makeup of the city was 96.9% White and 3.1% Asian.

There were 104 households, of which 26.9% had children under the age of 18 living with them, 51.0% were married couples living together, 8.7% had a female householder with no husband present, 1.9% had a male householder with no wife present, and 38.5% were non-families. 33.7% of all households were made up of individuals, and 8.7% had someone living alone who was 65 years of age or older. The average household size was 2.18 and the average family size was 2.78.

The median age in the city was 45.8 years. 23.3% of residents were under the age of 18; 3.1% were between the ages of 18 and 24; 22.9% were from 25 to 44; 35.7% were from 45 to 64; and 15% were 65 years of age or older. The gender makeup of the city was 48.9% male and 51.1% female.

=== 2000 census ===
As of the census of 2000, there were 262 people, 104 households, and 79 families living in the city. The population density was 1,747.4 inhabitants per square mile (674.7/km^{2}). There were 111 housing units at an average density of 740.3 per square mile (285.8/km^{2}). The racial makeup of the city was 99.62% White and 0.38% Asian. Hispanic or Latino of any race were 0.38% of the population.

There were 104 households, out of which 32.7% had children under the age of 18 living with them, 67.3% were married couples living together, 6.7% had a female householder with no husband present, and 24.0% were non-families. 22.1% of all households were made up of individuals, and 6.7% had someone living alone who was 65 years of age or older. The average household size was 2.52 and the average family size was 2.96.

In the city, the population was spread out, with 27.5% under the age of 18, 6.5% from 18 to 24, 25.2% from 25 to 44, 28.2% from 45 to 64, and 12.6% who were 65 years of age or older. The median age was 39 years. For every 100 females, there were 111.3 males. For every 100 females age 18 and over, there were 104.3 males.

The median income for a household in the city was $38,333, and the median income for a family was $42,250. Males had a median income of $31,000 versus $20,833 for females. The per capita income for the city was $35,785. About 3.7% of families and 6.7% of the population were below the poverty line, including 11.6% of those under the age of eighteen and 9.1% of those 65 or over.
