= Hancock, Pennsylvania =

Unincorporated community in Pennsylvania, US

- Unincorporated community
- Location within Pennsylvania
- Coordinates: 40°30′17″N 75°40′57″W
- Country: United States
- State: Pennsylvania
- County: Berks
- Township: Longswamp
- Elevation: 472 ft (144 m)
- Time zone: UTC-5 (Eastern (EST))
  - Summer (DST): UTC-4 (EDT)
- Area codes: 610 and 484
- GNIS feature ID: 1176448

Hancock is an unincorporated community in Longswamp Township in Berks County, Pennsylvania, United States. Hancock is located at the intersection of State Street and Park Avenue.
