= Cyrus B. Comstock =

United States Army general (1831–1910)

Cyrus Ballou Comstock
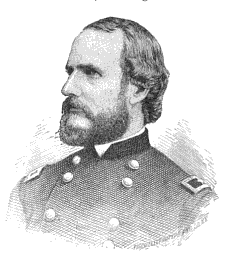
- Born: February 3, 1831; Wrentham, Massachusetts, US
- Died: May 29, 1910 (aged 79) New York City, US
- Buried: West Point Cemetery
- Allegiance: United States; Union
- Branch: United States Army; Union Army
- Service years: 1855–1895
- Rank: Colonel; Brevet Major General
- Commands: Chief Engineer: II Corps; Army of the Potomac; Army of the Tennessee; Department of North Carolina
- Conflicts: American Civil War

Cyrus Ballou Comstock (February 3, 1831 – May 29, 1910) was a career officer in the Regular Army of the United States. After graduating from the United States Military Academy at West Point in 1855, Comstock served with the Army Corps of Engineers. At the beginning of the American Civil War, he assisted with the fortification of Washington, D.C. In 1862, he was transferred to the field, eventually becoming chief engineer of the Army of the Potomac. In 1863 during the Siege of Vicksburg, he served as the chief engineer of the Army of the Tennessee.

The most significant phase of Comstock's career began in November 1864 when he was appointed to the staff of Lt. Gen. Ulysses S. Grant, becoming Grant's senior aide-de-camp. In 1865, Comstock was appointed the senior engineer in the assault on Fort Fisher, North Carolina, and the assault on Mobile, Alabama, both of which were successful. By the end of the war, Comstock had earned the awards of the honorary grades of brevet major general in the Volunteer Army and brevet brigadier general in the Regular Army.

After the close of the war, Comstock served on the military commission for the trial of the conspirators in the assassination of President Abraham Lincoln. He was dismissed from the commission for his criticism of the proceedings. Later Comstock continued with the Army Corps of Engineers, took part in several engineering projects, and served on the Mississippi River Commission, of which he was president.

== Early life ==
Born in Wrentham, Massachusetts, to Nathan and Betsy Comstock on February 3, 1831, Cyrus Comstock attended the United States Military Academy at West Point. He graduated first in his class in 1855. Following his graduation, Comstock was assigned to the Army Corps of Engineers and assisted with the design and construction of several fortifications. He also served as an instructor of engineering at West Point.

== Civil War service ==
At the commencement of the Civil War, Comstock, then holding the rank of first lieutenant in the Regular Army, was transferred from West Point to Washington, D.C. He became an assistant to Brig. Gen. John G. Barnard, the engineer in charge of the fortifications of Washington and later chief engineer of the Army of the Potomac.

=== Army of the Potomac ===
When the Army of the Potomac took the field in the spring of 1862 during Maj. Gen. George B. McClellan's Peninsular Campaign, Comstock continued to serve as Barnard's assistant. On June 1, 1862, during the Peninsular Campaign, Comstock was appointed chief engineer of the II Corps. He continued with the Army of the Potomac through the remainder of the Peninsular Campaign and through the Maryland Campaign.

Maj. Gen. Ambrose Burnside succeeded McClellan and appointed Comstock the chief engineer of the Army of the Potomac. During the Fredericksburg Campaign, Comstock was faced with the difficult task of constructing pontoon bridges over the Rappahannock River, a debacle which proved to be one of the most challenging of his career. Due to confusion in Washington, D.C. at the War Department, the materials necessary for the construction of the bridges did not arrive at Falmouth, Virginia at the same time as the Army of the Potomac. Despite Comstock's urgent telegraphs and messages, which went unanswered, it took nearly a month for the pontoons to arrive during which time the Union army had completely lost the element of surprise, the Confederate army had dug in at Fredericksburg, Virginia and morale within the Army of the Potomac had sunk. When the material for the bridges finally did arrive, Comstock personally led men from the 50th New York Engineers in seeing to the task of construction. In piecing together the bridges on the Rappahannock River, Comstock and other soldiers were dangerously exposed to enemy fire.

When Maj. Gen. Joseph Hooker reorganized the Army of the Potomac in the spring of 1863, Comstock was removed as chief engineer of that army and placed in command of a battalion of engineers. In that capacity, he played an important role in the Battle of Chancellorsville, overseeing the construction of pontoon bridges over various rivers which first allowed the advance of the Army of the Potomac and later facilitated its retreat after Union forces were defeated.

=== Siege of Vicksburg ===
After the Battle of Chancellorsville, Comstock was transferred to the Army of the Tennessee which was, at that time, involved in the Siege of Vicksburg, Mississippi, under the command of Maj. Gen. Ulysses Grant. Comstock arrived at Vicksburg in June 1863 and set to work on improving the siege works. His efforts earned Grant's respect. Comstock was soon promoted to major and appointed chief engineer of the Army of the Tennessee. The Siege of Vicksburg was successful, in part due to Comstock's supervision of the overall siege works, and the city surrendered to Union forces on July 4, 1863. This victory marked a major turning point in the war as the Union Army gained control of the Mississippi River. The impression that Comstock made on Grant would have a significant impact on Comstock's career later in the war.

Comstock remained with the Army of the Tennessee into the fall of 1863. On November 19, he became assistant inspector general of the Department of the Mississippi and promoted to lieutenant colonel of volunteers. He served in this role until March 1864.

=== General Grant's staff ===
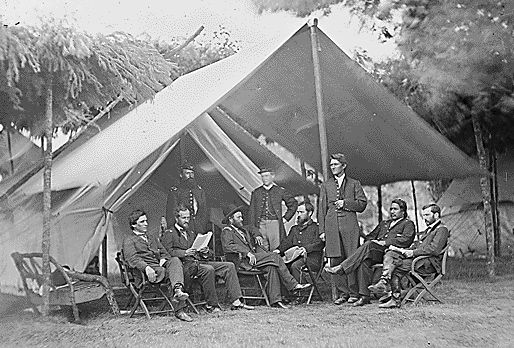
Staff of Lt. Gen. Ulysses Grant c. 1864 in a photograph by Mathew Brady. Bvt. Brig. Gen. Cyrus Comstock is at the far right.

On March 12, 1864, Grant was appointed general-in-chief of the United States Army and moved his headquarters to the eastern theater in Virginia. Grant asked Comstock to come with him as his senior aide-de-camp. Grant determined to command in the field, following and directing the movements of the Army of the Potomac in a major offensive during the summer of 1864 known as the Overland Campaign. During the campaign, Comstock played a key role in coordinating the movements of the various corps of the army and personally conveying Grant's orders to the corps commanders. His efforts were particularly successful during the Battle of the Wilderness for which Comstock won a commendation from Grant and a brevet promotion to lieutenant colonel in the Regular Army.

Comstock was temporarily detached from Grant's staff and appointed by Grant to the post of chief engineer of the Department of North Carolina in January 1865. The transfer was prompted by Maj. Gen. Benjamin Butler's failure to take Fort Fisher in December 1864. The fort was the last Confederate stronghold on the east coast. Serving under the command of Maj. Gen. Alfred Terry, Comstock assisted in planning a second and successful assault on Fort Fisher. Following this victory, Comstock was awarded the grade of brevet colonel in the Regular Army. Comstock also was nominated by President Abraham Lincoln on January 23, 1865 for the award of the honorary grade of brevet brigadier general, U.S. Volunteers, to rank from January 15, 1865, for gallant services in the capture of Fort Fisher and the U.S. Senate confirmed the award on February 14, 1865. He returned to Virginia and to his role as Grant's senior aide, but did not remain long.

In March 1865, Grant again dispatched Comstock to aid in a key siege operation—this time to Mobile, Alabama, the last Confederate stronghold on the Gulf of Mexico. There Comstock served under Maj. Gen. Edward Canby and assisted in operations leading to the surrender of Mobile after the Battle of Spanish Fort and the Battle of Fort Blakeley in April 1865. While Comstock was serving in Alabama, Gen. Robert E. Lee surrendered to Grant after the Battle of Appomattox Courthouse, essentially ending the Civil War. On January 13, 1866, President Andrew Johnson nominated Comstock for the award of the honorary grade of brevet major general, U.S. Volunteers, to rank from March 26, 1865, for faithful and meritorious services during the campaign against the city of Mobile and its defenses, and the U.S. Senate confirmed the award on March 12, 1866. On April 10, 1866, President Andrew Johnson nominated Comstock for the award of the honorary grade of brevet brigadier general, U.S. Army, (Regular Army), to rank from March 13, 1865, for gallant and meritorious services in the campaign ending with the capture of Mobile, Alabama, and the U.S. Senate confirmed the award on May 4, 1866.

== Post-war life ==
=== Lincoln assassination ===
In May 1865, while still serving on Grant's staff, Comstock was called to serve as one of the nine military commissioners to oversee the trial of the conspirators in the assassination of Abraham Lincoln. At first, Comstock was eager to see the prosecution of the conspirators, writing that, for them, "death is too good." However, as the trial proceeded, Comstock became disturbed by the secrecy of the military proceedings. Concerned about the violation of the defendants' rights, he began to openly argue for the case to be transferred to a civilian court. President Andrew Johnson removed Comstock from the commission due to Comstock's protests. The rationale for the removal, as explained to Comstock by Secretary of War Edwin M. Stanton, was that Grant had also been a potential target of the conspirators and the commissioners felt that Comstock, due to his closeness to Grant, could not be counted on to act impartially.

=== Later career ===
Comstock served on Grant's staff until 1866, then returned to service with the Corps of Engineers and remained on active duty until 1895 when he retired with the rank of colonel upon reaching the mandatory retirement age of 64. In the course of his post-war duty, he served with several boards and commissions including the Permanent Board of Engineers in New York City, the geodetic survey of the north and northwestern lakes of the United States, and was president for many years of the Mississippi River Commission.

Comstock was a prominent member of the National Academy of Sciences and bequeathed a fund to the Academy to support an award to a scientist conducting innovative work in the investigation of electricity, magnetism, or radiant energy. Today known as the Comstock Prize in Physics, the award in the amount of $20,000 is granted every five years by the Academy.

Comstock was advanced to brigadier general on the retired list in April 1904. He died in New York City and was buried at the West Point Cemetery two days later.

=== Family ===
In 1869, Comstock married Elizabeth "Minnie" Blair, daughter of Montgomery Blair who had served as United States Postmaster General during the Lincoln administration. They had a daughter, Elizabeth Marion Comstock, who was born in Detroit, Michigan in 1872 while Comstock was at work on the geodetic survey of the Great Lakes.

=== Genealogy ===
He had an interest in family history and in later years he published two books about Comstock genealogy. The first one, published in 1905, was titled Some Descendants of Samuel Comstock of Providence, R.I. In 1907, he published an expanded version of the Comstock genealogy titled A Comstock Genealogy Descendants of William Comstock of New London, Conn. It included ten generations of descendants of William Comstock.

Here is a link to his 1905 Book titled: Some Descendants of Samuel Comstock of Providence, R.I. Who Died About 1660'

== See also ==
- List of Massachusetts generals in the American Civil War
- Massachusetts in the American Civil War
