= Northrup Hill School District 10 =

- U.S. National Register of Historic Places
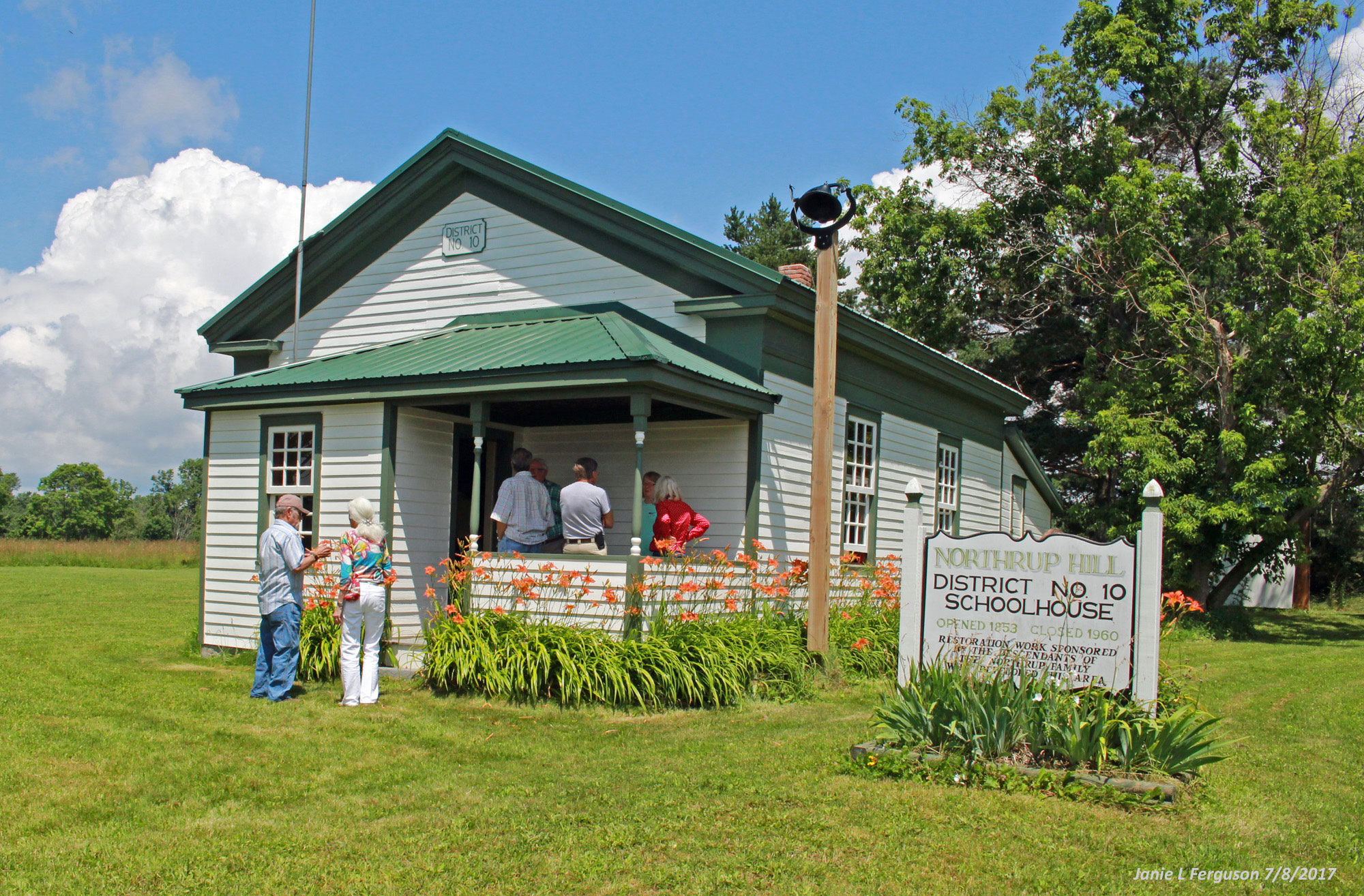

- Location within New York Location within the United States
- Location: Learn Rd. Rathbone, New York
- Coordinates: 42°8′51″N 77°22′30″W
- Area: 1.6 acres (0.65 ha)
- Built: ca. 1850
- Architectural style: Greek Revival
- NRHP reference No.: 99000196
- Added to NRHP: February 12, 1999

Northrup Hill School District 10 is a historic one-room school building located at Rathbone in Steuben County, New York. It was built about 1850 and is a vernacular Greek Revival style, one story, rectangular, gable roofed frame structure.

It was listed on the National Register of Historic Places in 1999. It is now used as a museum by the Middletown Historical Society.
