= Mount Northrop =

Peak in Minnesota, USA

Coordinates: 48.0620°N 91.0556°W

Mount Northrop is a peak in the Sawtooth Mountains of northeastern Minnesota. Its elevation is 2,000 feet (610 m) above sea level, or about 500 feet (150 m) above Kekekabic Lake. It was named for Cyrus Northrop, who was the president of the University of Minnesota from 1884 until 1911.
