= Cyrus Northrop =

American academic (1834–1922)

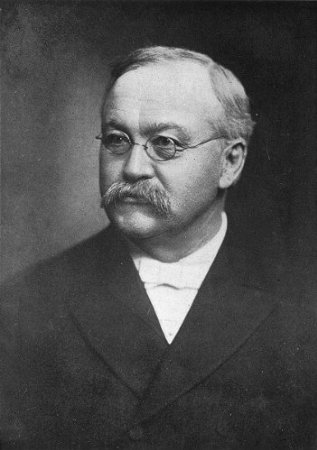

2nd President of the University of Minnesota
- In office 1884–1911
- Preceded by: William Watts Folwell
- Succeeded by: George Edgar Vincent

Personal details
- Born: September 30, 1834 Ridgefield, Connecticut
- Died: April 3, 1922 (aged 88) Minneapolis, Minnesota

Cyrus Northrop (Note: The last name is spelled Northrop, not Northrup, although scattered typos may be found throughout Minnesota Gopher yearbooks and other sources.) (September 30, 1834 – April 3, 1922) was an American university administrator and the second president of the University of Minnesota.

== Early life ==
Northrop at 18 years old

Cyrus Northrop, Sr. was born in Ridgefield, Connecticut. He graduated from Yale University in 1857 where he was a member of both Alpha Sigma Phi fraternity and of Delta Kappa Epsilon fraternity. (Note: There is some confusion about Northrop's fraternity affiliation which has been published, repeating an error that had crept into the 1890 Minnesota yearbook. This is discussed at length on the Talk page. Cyrus Northrop Sr. was a member, and toward the end of his life in 1919 even a national officer of Alpha Sigma Phi fraternity, according to that fraternity's historical records. At Yale during those early years, men inclined to fraternity life joined a new society each year. Alpha Sigma Phi had been a sophomore society at Yale while Northrop was an undergraduate, while Delta Kappa Epsilon, then a junior society, was the fraternity he chose for the following year. Northrop was a member of both (per the 1890 DKE Catalogue). Decades later, his son, Cyrus Northrop Jr. became a 4-year member of Delta Kappa Epsilon fraternity at the University of Minnesota, in the class of 1893.) Northrop graduated from the Yale Law School in 1859. Two years later he was appointed clerk of the Connecticut House of Representatives and in 1862 clerk of the Connecticut State Senate. About these early appointments, one of his fraternities wrote in a 1916 retrospective, that:

This [was] a rare distinction and indicates the great versatility and strong personality of the man that manifested themselves very early in his life.

He was elected to Phi Beta Kappa in 1857.

Northrop married Miss Anna E. Warren, a daughter of J. D. Warren of Stamford, Connecticut on his twenty-eighth birthday, September 30, 1862. An accomplished woman, she served as advisor and liaison to many campus groups during his tenure at Minnesota.

In 1863 he returned to New Haven and became the editor of the New Haven Palladium, a position "he filled with rare ability and skill."

== Career and accomplishments ==
Northrop was elected to the chair of Rhetoric and English Literature at Yale, a position he held from 1863 to 1884. He retired from Yale to become president of the University of Minnesota, a post he held from 1884 to 1911. The Tomahawk retrospective continues: "...he continued to labor in the steadily broadening field of education for the next twenty-seven years, retiring [again] in April, 1911, from active work loved, honored, and respected by hosts of young men and women as "Prexy" and a firm and true friend to all."

During Northrop's presidency, the University of Minnesota came to rank as one of the most prestigious of American public universities.

Under his 27 years of leadership at Minnesota, the following milestones were reached:

- Enrollment increased seventeen-fold: from 289 to over 5,000.
- The number of faculty increased twelve-fold.
- The Minneapolis campus increased from two buildings to twenty-three.
- The Agricultural (St. Paul) campus increased from two buildings to twenty-three, as well.
- The School of Agriculture became the first successful such program in the nation.
- The university was expanded from a single college to eleven.
- The Dentistry School was established and ranked as the finest in the world.
- The Law and Medical schools were likewise ranked as among the best in the US.
- His first year, there were 19 graduates; in his last year the school awarded 580 diplomas.
- He was absolutely adored by the students, the alumni, and the state in a personal way that seems unattainable now, in comparison.

Northrop's daughter Elizabeth married Joseph Warren Beach, a famous literary scholar who later chaired the English Department at the University of Minnesota.

When asked to speak at the dedication of a cemetery outdoors in cold rain, Northrop said, "I hope you will excuse me for not removing my hat, as I have no desire to contribute personally to the success of this enterprise."

== Post-presidency ==
Upon retirement he became a beloved President Emeritus of the University of Minnesota. In September 1915, Northrop was elected Grand Senior President of Alpha Sigma Phi Fraternity, a position in which he served until 1919.

== Degrees and honorary degrees ==
In 1886 his alma mater, Yale, conferred upon him her highest honor, that of LL.D. Similar degrees were conferred upon him by the University of Wisconsin and Illinois College, both in 1904, to be followed by South Carolina College in 1905, and the University of Minnesota.

The Tomahawk closes their retrospective with: "President Northrop is affectionately remembered among the 'Sigs, and has spoken kindly of his associations with them when an active member of Alpha Chapter at Yale in 1855–6. A glance at his picture will convince anyone that he is still a young man in spite of his many years of experience and great activity."

For his leadership and vision, the Minnesota Geological Survey honored Dr. Northrop by naming a mountain after him: Mount Northrop is located in Lake County, in the range of the Sawtooth Mountains. He is also the namesake of the city of Northrop, Minnesota. The Northrop Collegiate School for Girls (later absorbed into The Blake School) was likewise named in Northrop's honor.

Northrop died on April 3, 1922 at his home in Minneapolis. His friend and the first President of the University of Minnesota, William Watts Folwell, eulogized him in the Minnesota Gopher yearbook, picturing his funeral procession on p. 271 that year. By the following year, Minnesota had risen in a spectacular commemoration plan, explained in a retrospective article in the 1924 Gopher yearbook of over 30 pages. It described completion within less than two years of a campaign that raised the then-astonishing amount of $650,000 in student and faculty subscriptions (~pledges) toward the building of both an auditorium dedicated to the honor of Northrop, and a stadium to honor Minnesota's war dead.

== Publications ==
Northrop published Addresses, Educational and Patriotic (1910). He encouraged poet Arthur Upson to revise the song, "Hail! Minnesota".

== See also ==
- List of presidents of the University of Minnesota

== Notes ==
Academic offices
Preceded by William Watts Folwell	2nd President of the University of Minnesota; 1884–1911	Succeeded by George Edgar Vincent
