= Sandy Northrop =

American film director

- Education: University of Michigan
- Occupations: Producer, director, editor

Sandy Northrop is an American author, producer, director, and editor who has contributed to over 25 PBS documentaries. Wind & Stars Production Group is the bannerhead under which she produces. Northrop is best known for producing Vietnam Passage: Journeys from War to Peace, a trilogy on post war Vietnam, as well as her work on the history of American editorial cartoons.

== Biography ==
Northrop received a BFA in photography from the University of Michigan in 1969 and graduated from Stanford University's Masters communications program in 1972.

From 1976 to 1985, she worked for the National Geographic Society in Africa as location manager and editor on two television specials. Last Stand in Eden covered the plight of endangered elephants in Kenya and Gorillas, explored Rwanda's mountain gorillas. Northrop spent eight years producing historical montages for PBS's National Memorial Day and A Capitol Fourth live concert celebrations. In 1996 she co-authored Drawn & Quartered, with Steven Hess on the history of American editorial cartoons and their impact on political and popular culture. The book grew out an unaired television special funded by of two NEH grants.

In 1997 Northrop moved to Hanoi, Vietnam. While there she produced, directed, shot and edited Vietnam Passage: Journeys from War to Peace, a trilogy of three one-hour television specials on post-war Vietnam that premiered on PBS. Assignment Hanoi, the first program, told the story of Pete Peterson, who having survived six years as a POW in the “Hanoi Hilton” during the war and was returning to Vietnam as the United States' first Ambassador since 1975. The second program, Vietnam Passage: Journeys from War to Peace highlighted the Vietnamese perspective on the “American” War and its aftermath. The Next Generation, the final program in the trilogy, focused on eight Vietnamese kids, born during or just after the war and their hopes for the future. The Library of Congress selected Next Generation for its permanent collection.

After returning to the United States, Northrop combined her experience in filmmaking and political cartoons to produce two segments for The NewsHour with Jim Lehrer on the 2004 presidential race as seen by the cartoonists. Northrop followed The Economist's Kevin Kallaugher who was making the transition for two-dimensional to three dimensional caricatures. The resulting film, The World According to Kal, screened at the exhibit Mightier Than the Sword: The Satirical Pen of Kal, at the Walters Art Museum in Baltimore the summer of 2006. Northrop also curated a retrospective on United States Presidential Elections, 1796–2008, as covered by editorial cartoonists, for the Newseum in 2008. In 2011, Northrop and Steven Hess published American Political Cartoons: The Evolution of a National Identity 1754–2010.
