= Corning–Painted Post Airport =

Corning-Painted Post Airport
- IATA: none; ICAO: none; FAA LID: 7N1

Summary
- Airport type: Public
- Owner: Town of Erwin IDA
- Serves: Corning, New York
- Location: Painted Post, New York
- Elevation AMSL: 963 ft (294 m)
- Coordinates: 42°10′48″N 077°07′18″W
- Website: http://erwinny.org/teidadept.html

Map
- Location of airport in New York

Runways
Direction	Length		Surface
Direction	ft	m	Surface
13/31	3,269	996	Asphalt

Statistics (2012)
- Aircraft operations: 9,025
- Based aircraft: 28
- Source: Federal Aviation Administration

Corning–Painted Post Airport (FAA LID: 7N1) is a public use airport in Steuben County, New York, United States. It is located two nautical miles (4 km) northwest of the central business district of Corning. The airport is owned by the Town of Erwin and located near Painted Post, New York. It is included in the National Plan of Integrated Airport Systems for 2011–2015, which categorized it as a general aviation facility.

== Facilities and aircraft ==
Corning–Painted Post Airport covers an area of 76 acres (31 ha) at an elevation of 963 feet (294 m) above mean sea level. It has one runway designated 13/31 with an asphalt surface measuring 3,269 by 75 feet (996 x 23 m).

For the 12-month period ending September 19, 2012, the airport had 9,025 aircraft operations, an average of 24 per day: 99.7% general aviation and 0.3% air taxi. At that time there were 28 aircraft based at this airport: 96% single-engine and 4% helicopter.

One of the local operators is the Costa Flying Service, owing its name to Joseph Costa, a local pilot that attempted to cross the Atlantic in 1936, via Brazil. In the 1940s it was called "Costa's Airport". His son, Joseph R. Costa is currently the airport's manager.

== See also ==
- List of airports in New York
