= Corning train wreck =

1912 railway accident in New York State

- Wreckage of Corning train wreck

Details
- Date: July 4, 1912; 114 years ago 5.21 a.m.
- Location: Town of Corning, Steuben County, near Corning, New York
- Coordinates: 42°7′25″N 77°1′08″W
- Country: United States
- Operator: Delaware, Lackawanna and Western Railroad
- Incident type: Rear-end collision
- Cause: Signal passed at danger

Statistics
- Trains: 2
- Deaths: 39
- Injured: 88

The Corning train wreck (also known as the Gibson train wreck) was a railway accident that occurred at 5.21 a.m. on July 4, 1912, on the Delaware, Lackawanna and Western Railroad at East Corning freight station in Gibson three miles east of Corning in New York State, leaving 39 dead and 88 injured.

== Accident ==
At 3:50 a.m. freight train No.393 left Elmira with 55 loaded cars; it experienced steaming problems and at 4:46 a.m. pulled into a siding at East Corning freight station to investigate. As it was doing so a coupling broke, leaving several cars on the main line. The line operated Automatic Block Signals; the presence of a train in the block section automatically setting the preceding semaphore signals; the first to caution, the next to danger. In addition as it was foggy the flagman placed two torpedoes on the line to protect the rear of the train.

Passenger train No.9 running from Hoboken, New Jersey, to Buffalo and Niagara Falls left Elmira at 4:47; it consisted of ten cars hauled by two locomotives. It heeded the signals and came to a halt behind the disabled freight train. The engineer of No.9 decided to assist the freight train and the head locomotive was uncoupled to push the loose cars ahead onto the siding.

Meanwhile, train No.11, an eight car mail express pulled by a Wootten-type engine, also travelling from Hoboken to Buffalo, departed Elmira at 5:00 a.m. For some reason the engineer, William Schroeder, ignored two signals, one at caution and one at danger and plowed into the back of No.9 at a speed of 60 mph. The rear coach of No.9 was 'completely destroyed', the next one being of steel construction was less damaged only the 'vestibules and platforms on both ends were crushed', however it was 'stripped off its trucks and telescoped the third (wooden) car from the end through two-thirds of its length. All but two of the mail express cars were derailed and whiplashed, bringing down the telegraph poles on both sides of the track; meaning it was an hour before news of the disaster reached Corning. Meanwhile, hordes of spectators gathered hampering subsequent access by medical and rescue teams. A special relief train arrived from Elmira at 7 a.m. carrying doctors and nurses, but by 9 a.m. injured were still trapped in the wreckage.

== Inquest and investigation ==
At the coroner's inquest it was revealed that 95% of the victims had suffered fractured skulls, the conclusion being that they had their heads out of the windows to try to determine the cause of the delay. The inquest also heard that engineer Schroeder had appeared drunk the morning of the accident at 12:30 a.m. Moreover, he was late for work that morning, appearing only after two men had been sent to rouse him. Schroeder denied being drunk, stating that he had drunk two gins 'as medicine'. The inquest completed on July 17, 1912, acquitting the Lackawanna Railroad but holding engineer Schroeder responsible for the crash.

The ICC investigation, published on July 30, 1912, centered on why No. 11 failed to stop. Schroeder said that the fog was very thick as he approached East Corning and that "he was able to distinguish signals only by very carefully watching for them, at times they could not be seen a distance of one car length". He also admitted that due to problems with the steam injectors he was "not constantly on the watch for the signals" and did not see the caution signal, the fusee or the flagman; only becoming aware of the train ahead when he was 150 feet from it. A member of the New York Public Service Commission stated "The railroad rules are very strict. The engineers are required to know the location of every signal. That is part of their business. It is their duty to observe every signal, if for any reason, they cannot or do not see it as the train passes, it is their duty to regard it as a danger signal and stop the train".

The investigation also criticized the flagman from No. 9, as unlike the flagman from the freight train, he failed to deploy torpedoes on the track (in his evidence he stated that when he heard No. 11 approaching he lit a fusee and placed it next to the engineman's side of the track and also flagged the oncoming train with a red flag but the engineman was looking across to the other side of the engine and failed to notice him).

But as well as attributing blame to individuals the investigation also made a number of recommendations. The regulations guiding the use of torpedoes should be clarified as they rely too greatly on the judgment of rail staff. Automatic block signaling would have provided far greater protection had the blocks overlapped; meaning that protection would have been provided by two stop signals (rather than just one) as well as the caution, hence one signal missed would not then have resulted a disaster. Finally, the safety of all-steel cars was highlighted over wooden construction as only two people were killed in the steel car, "the substitution of all steel equipment for wooden equipment in high speed passenger service shall be required at the earliest practical date".
