= Joseph Costa (aviator) =

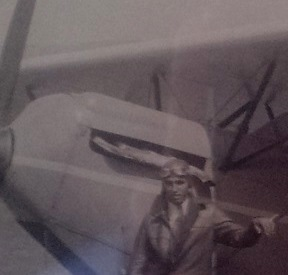
- Joseph Costa by his Brunner-Winkle Bird
- Born: José Costa; February 22, 1909; Caniço, Santa Cruz, Madeira Island, Portugal
- Died: November 11, 1998 (aged 89); Corning, New York, United States
- Occupation: Aviator
- Spouse: Catherine Cuda Costa

Joseph Costa (February 22, 1909 – November 11, 1998) was a Portuguese American aviator who had an airport named after him and received a number of American awards for his contributions to aviation. In 1936 he attempted a flight from the United States to Portugal.

== Early life ==
Joseph Costa was born as José Costa in Caniço on Madeira Island on 22 February 1909. He was aged six when his parents emigrated to the United States, taking him along. The Costas settled in Corning, New York. He became known as Joseph Costa, Joseph A. Costa or Joe Costa. In April 1936 Costa obtained USA citizenship.

== Aviation ==
Costa became a pilot, flight instructor, FAA inspector, airplane mechanic and reseller. He founded an aviation company, the Costa Flying Service, operating in Corning–Painted Post Airport, until the early 2000s also owned by Costa and known as "Costa Airport" or "Costa Field".

Costa was the first resident of Corning to get a pilot's licence, obtained at the Syracuse branch of the Curtiss Wright Flying Service when he was only 21 years old. His flight instructor was Fred. T. McGlynn. After a few hours he flew solo, over the Onondaga lake. After teaching Costa how to fly, McGlynn left Curtiss for the General Electric Company in Schenectady. He was assigned to test GEC beacon equipment and new altimeters. He had been the chief pilot of General Aviation Company, before the acquisition by Eastern Aeronautical Corporation, having then moving to Curtiss. He completed his pilot exam in Binghamton, with inspector Asbury B. Meadows of the Department of Commerce.

Soon afterward, he started advertising passenger flights and operating from nearby Erwin Field on the Painted Post-Coopers Plains Road (Rte 415), flying types such as the Fairchild 24 and the Travel Air.

In 1930, José Costa became determined to fly from New York to Madeira. At that time he owned a Brunner-Winkle Bird A, registered NC834W, which was not capable of such a long flight.

Corning Painted Post airport took Costa's name, and flying events such as the Federal Air Circus of Saratoga, NY, were held there, with Freddy Weisher. The event included parachute-jumping (performed by George Seaver), bomb-dropping, and stunt-flying.

On July 24, 1935 Costa acquired Lockheed Vega Model 5, registered NC105N. The aircraft had originally been owned by Statoil and flown by the father of astronaut Buzz Aldrin. Costa later had to sell it and it was bought by Monroe T. Breed of Corning, NY on October 15, 1935. Additional gas tanks and heavy-duty landing gear were obtained from Art Goebel's Vega and oil tanks from Amelia Earhart's Vega. The Vega was christened "Crystal City" at Big Flats Airport on 20 October 1935. Joseph Costa re-acquired it in the summer of 1936 and a NR registration was approved for "testing and long-distance flying". A Christian cross symbol was painted on the Vega's fuselage.

=== Transatlantic attempt in 1936 ===
José Costa was ready for his transatlantic flight attempt, from the US to Portugal, in 1936, flying the Lockheed Vega he had acquired for the purpose. Flight preparations included blind flying tests and approval for the additional fuel load. The start of the Spanish Civil War caused the US government to block a direct flight to Portugal, due to the risk of landing in Spanish territory. Instead, Costa would have to divert via South America.

The start of the Spanish Civil War caused the US government to block a direct flight to Portugal, due to the risk of landing in Spanish territory. Instead, Costa would have to divert via South America.

He finally departed from the American Airlines Field (now Elmira-Corning Regional Airport) on December 10, 1936, for his first stopover point at Miami, Florida. Bad weather forced him to divert via Jacksonville (Florida). On December 16 he set off for San Juan, Puerto Rico, departing Miami at 9:15 am assuming the risk of having to divert to Cuba or Haiti depending on weather conditions and fuel supply. He had six hours of autonomy, but at 5:30 pm the Pan-American Airways communication system was closed and there was no sign of him in any of the airports covered by Pan Am, Camp Columbia, outside of Havana (now Ciudad Libertad Airport), Santiago de Cuba, and in the Dominican Republic. Pan Am reported the day after that once more bad weather caused a diversion to Dajabón in the Dominican Republic amidst the border definition problems with Haiti. He was jailed immediately, but freed the next day, so he was able leave the country and avoid bureaucratic problems. He arrived in San Juan on December 17.

The subsequent legs were to Paramaribo in Suriname and Belém in Brazil. The most complicated part followed, a long flight over the jungle to Rio de Janeiro. Due to fuel exhaustion, gas having been pilfered from one of the tanks, he had to ditch in a field in Serro, state of Minas Gerais, on January 15, 1937. Although he sustained hardly any injuries, the Vega was damaged beyond repair, only the engine being salvaged. He still arrived in Rio at the controls of an airplane, a WACO having been provided by the Brazilian Military Aviation for him to complete the last leg, after taking off from Belo Horizonte.

Despite having to abort the journey, he received plenty of attention in Brazil, his feat being widely reported in the news. The local Portuguese community gave him honours, inviting him to visit cultural centres and participate in several events. While in Brazil he had the opportunity to go the "Carnaval" in Belo Horizonte. He returned to the US in May. He soon borrowed an airplane, a 90 hp Kreider-Reisner Challenger biplane, owned by Erwin Smith of Tioga and started flying. The Vega's engine, brought back to Corning, was sought by Howard Hughes who sent his representative to meet Costa.

== Later years ==
During WWII Costa was a CAA (later renamed FAA) examiner in Kansas and Iowa, evaluating young cadets seeking to enter the air force. His private licences had been suspended in 1941, and was restored only in December 1942.

After the war, starting in 1946, he dedicated his life to civil aviation. There was the option to become a test pilot for new aircraft, but he considered it to be a dangerous job and declined the opportunity, focusing instead on developing the Costa airport and flying services.

== Private life ==
Costa married Catherine Cuda in 1939. They had a son in 1941 and a daughter in 1945.

Costa died in Corning in the 11 November 1998, aged 89.

== Awards ==
In 1993 the Empire State Aerosciences Museum gave him the Aviation Pioneer Award "in recognition of your outstanding contributions to the development and advancement of General Aviation."

In 1994 the Rochester Flight Standards District Office of the Federal Aviation Administration gave him a Lifetime Achievement Award, in recognition of his 65 years in aviation.

Also in 1994, the U.S. Department of Transportation, Federal Administration Administration, Eastern Region, gave him a Certificate of Appreciation in recognition of 65 years of distinction as an aviator.

== Legacy ==
José Costa was the first Madeira native to have an airport named after him, the second being Madeira's airport, bearing the name of football star Cristiano Ronaldo.

== See also ==
- Corning (New York) notable people
- Early transatlantic flights
- Luso-American people
- Corning–Painted Post Airport
