= Southside Historic District (Corning, New York) =

Historic district in New York, United States

- U.S. National Register of Historic Places
- U.S. Historic district
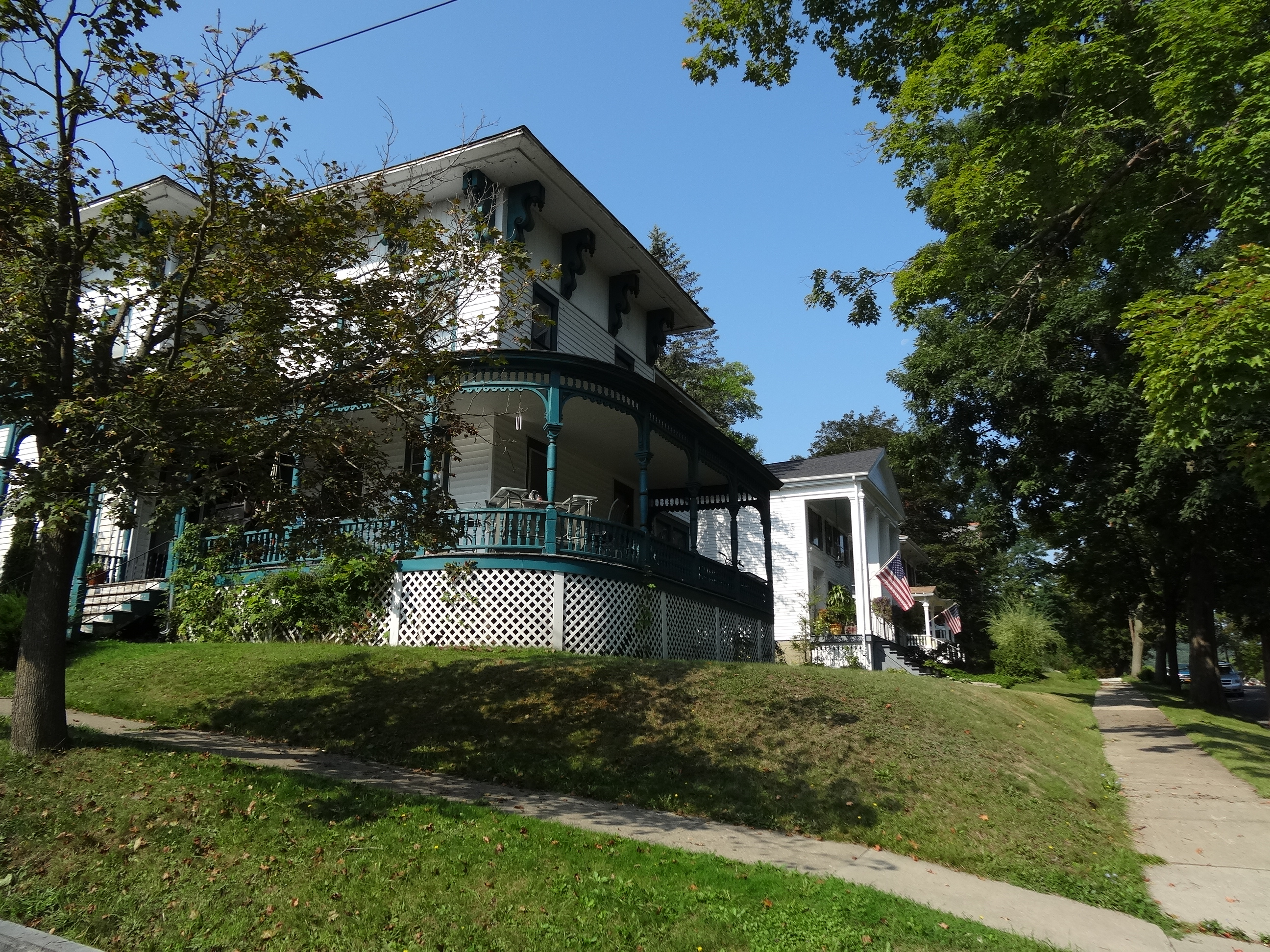
- Southside Historic District, September 2012

- Location within New York Location within the United States
- Location: Roughly bounded by NY 17, Chemung St., Spencer Hill, and Washington St., Corning, New York
- Coordinates: 42°8′21″N 77°3′21″W
- Area: 140 acres (57 ha)
- Built: c. 1835
- Architectural style: Late Victorian, Greek Revival, Federal
- NRHP reference No.: 98000137
- Added to NRHP: February 20, 1998

Southside Historic District is a national historic district located at Corning, Steuben County, New York. The district encompasses 624 contributing buildings, one contributing site and four contributing objects in a predominantly residential section of Corning. The district developed after 1835 and includes notable examples of Federal, Greek Revival, and Victorian architecture. Located in the district is the separately listed World War Memorial Library. Other notable buildings include the Steuben County Courthouse designed by J. Foster Warner, the "Voting Booth" (c. 1893-1898), Corning Free Academy (1922), the First United Methodist Church of Corning and Christ Episcopal Church.

It was listed on the National Register of Historic Places in 1998.
