= United States Post Office (Painted Post, New York) =

- US Post Office-Painted Post
- U.S. National Register of Historic Places
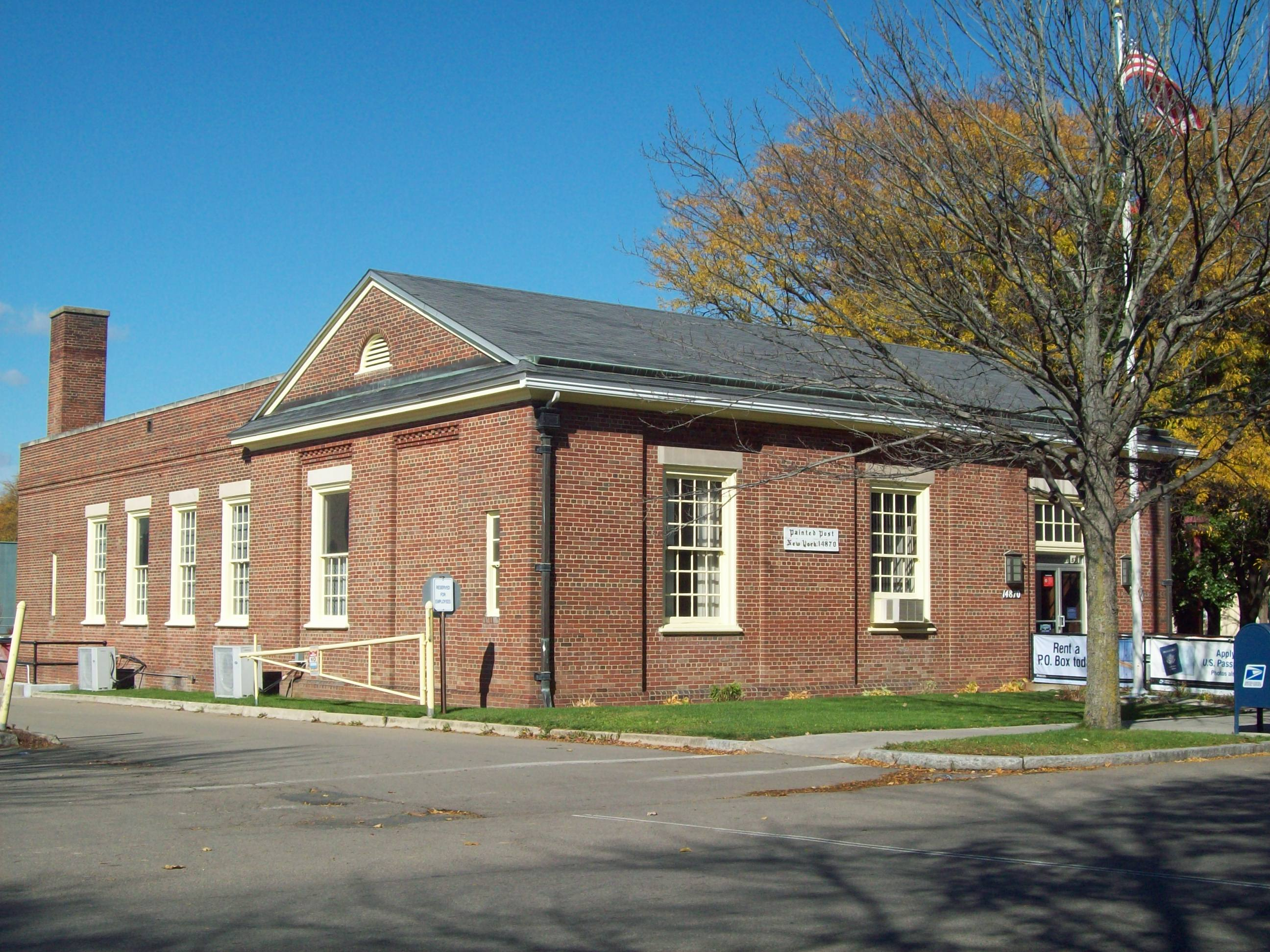
- U.S. Post Office, Painted Post, New York, October 2009

- Location within New York Location within the United States
- Interactive map showing the location for U.S. Post Office-Pained Point
- Location: 135 N. Hamilton St., Painted Post, New York
- Coordinates: 42°9′30″N 77°5′37″W
- Area: less than one acre
- Built: 1937
- Architect: Simon, Louis A.; Jones, Amy
- Architectural style: Colonial Revival
- MPS: US Post Offices in New York State, 1858-1943, TR
- NRHP reference No.: 88002395
- Added to NRHP: May 11, 1989

US Post Office-Painted Post is a historic post office building located at Painted Post in Steuben County, New York. It was designed in 1937 and built in 1937-1938 and is one of a number of post offices in New York State designed by the Office of the Supervising Architect of the Treasury Department, Louis A. Simon. It is a one-story, three bay structure clad in red brick in the Colonial Revival style. The interior features a 1939 mural by Amy Jones titled "Recording the Victory" and depicting a Revolutionary War scene.

It was listed on the National Register of Historic Places in 1989.
