= Painted Post station =

PAINTED POST
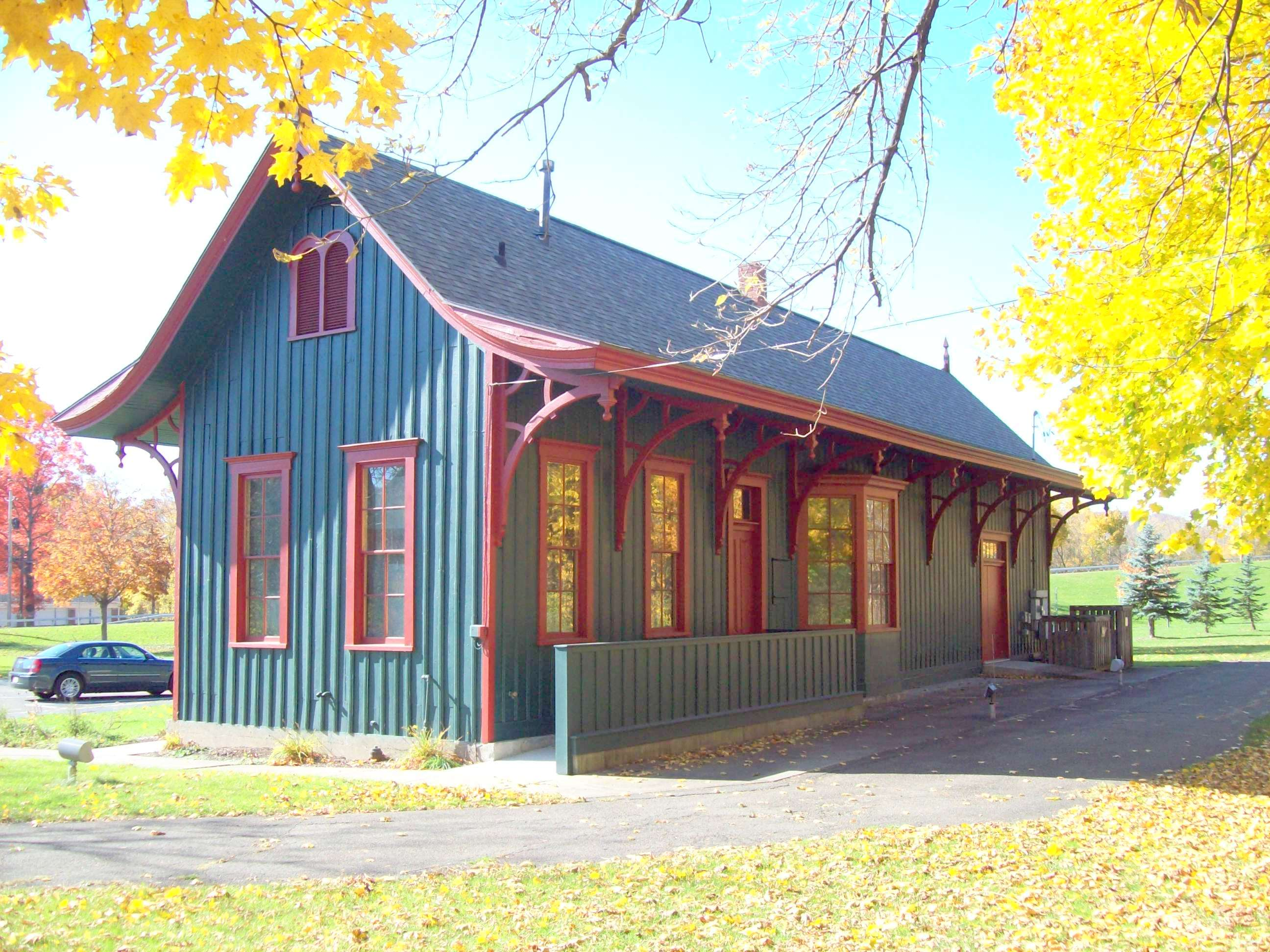
- Painted Post station in October 2009.

General information
- Location: 277 Steuben Street, Painted Post, New York 14870
- Coordinates: 42.162266°N 77.090943°W
- Platforms: 2
- Tracks: 2

Former services
Preceding station	Delaware, Lackawanna and Western Railroad	Following station
Leicester toward Buffalo	Main Line	Binghamton toward Hoboken
Coopers toward Buffalo	Main Line	Corning toward Hoboken
- Delaware, Lackawanna & Western Railroad Station
- U.S. National Register of Historic Places
- Location within New York Location within the United States
- Location: Jct. of Steuben St. and Victory Hwy., Painted Post, New York
- Coordinates: 42.16231°N 77.09103°W
- Area: 2 acres (0.81 ha)
- Built: 1881
- Architectural style: Italianate, Gothic Revival
- NRHP reference No.: 91001674
- Added to NRHP: November 21, 1991
Location

Painted Post station is a historic railway station at Painted Post in Steuben County, New York. It was constructed in 1881–1882 as a passenger and freight depot for the Delaware, Lackawanna and Western Railroad.

It was listed on the National Register of Historic Places in 1991 as the Delaware, Lackawanna and Western Railroad Station.

The depot is used as the Painted Post-Erwin Museum at the Depot, a museum of local history that is operated by the Corning-Painted Post Historical Society.

The Society also operates the Benjamin Patterson Inn, an early 19th-century period tavern in Corning, New York.
