= Benjamin Patterson Inn =

Historic commercial building in New York, United States

- Benjamin Patterson Inn also known as Jenning's Tavern
- U.S. National Register of Historic Places
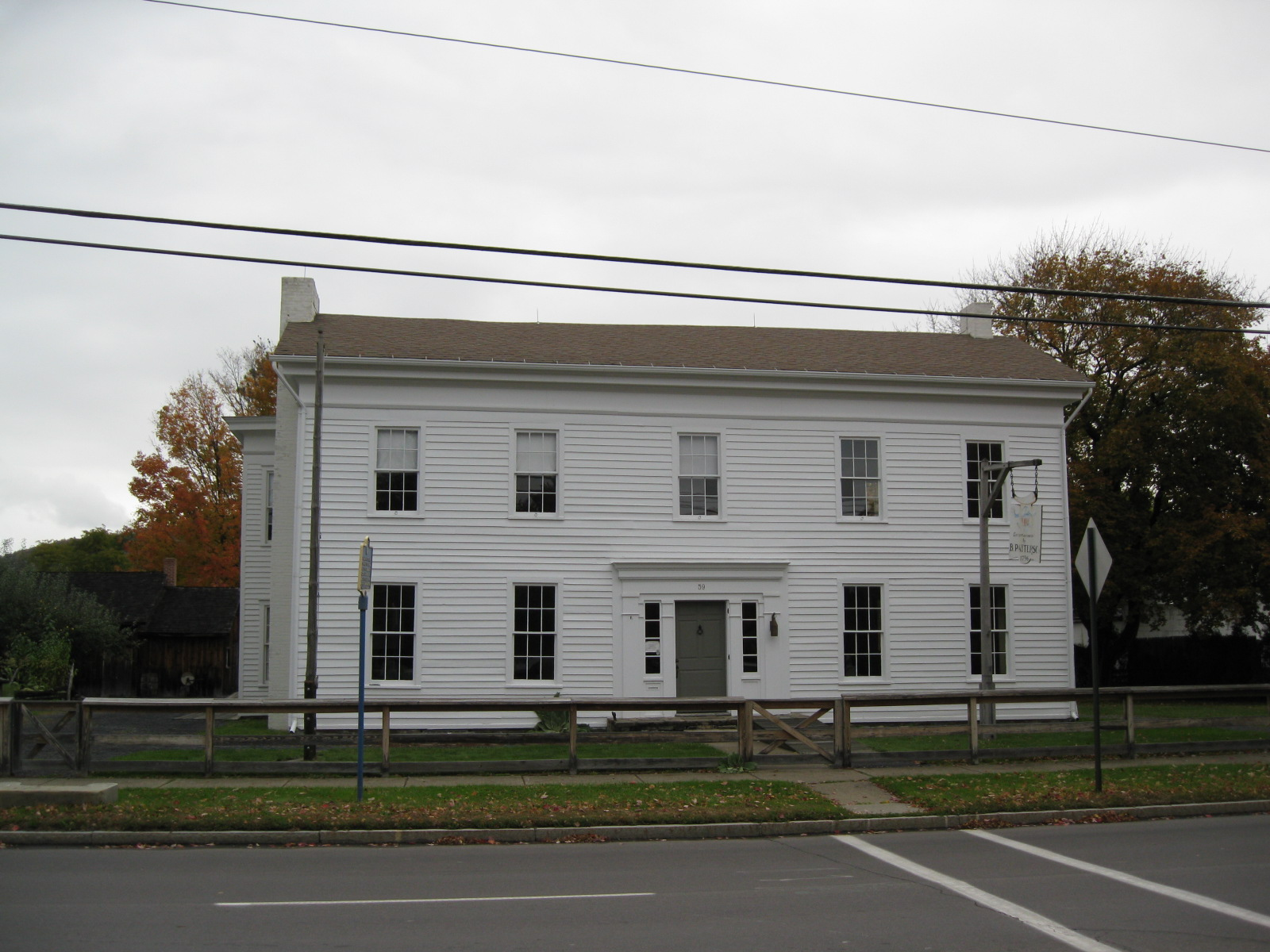
- Benjamin Patterson Inn (Jennings Tavern), October 2009

- Location within New York Location within the United States
- Location: 59 W. Pulteney St., Corning, New York
- Coordinates: 42°9′5″N 77°3′51″W
- Area: less than one acre
- Built: 1796
- Architectural style: Federal
- NRHP reference No.: 73001270
- Added to NRHP: September 20, 1973

Benjamin Patterson Inn, also known as Jenning's Tavern, is a historic inn and tavern located in Corning in Steuben County, New York. It is a two-story, ell shaped frame structure in the Federal style. Built in 1796, it is the oldest frame building in the area and perhaps all of Steuben County.

It was listed on the National Register of Historic Places in 1973.

The Benjamin Patterson Inn is a historic house operated as part of the Heritage Village of the Southern Finger Lakes by the Corning Painted Post Historical Society. Visitors can tour the historic tavern room, dining room, kitchen, guest quarters and innkeeper's quarters, and view the Society's collection of textile equipment in the Long Room. The Inn grounds also include an 1855 log cabin, an 1878 schoolhouse, a barn with agriculture tools and equipment and a working late 19th-century blacksmith shop.

The Society also operates the Painted Post-Erwin Museum, a museum of local history located in a late 19th-century railroad depot in Painted Post, New York.
