= Guthrie Corning Hospital =

- Guthrie

Geography
- Location: 1 Guthrie Drive, Corning, New York, United States
- Coordinates: 42°8′3.8″N 76°58′1.2″W

Organization
- Care system: Private
- Type: Community

Services
- Emergency department: Level III trauma center
- Beds: 65

Helipads
- Helipad: (ICAO: 8NY4)
Number	Length		Surface
Number	ft	m	Surface
h1	44	13	asphalt

History
- Founded: 1900

Links
- Website: www.guthrie.org/location/guthrie-corning-hospital
- Lists: Hospitals in New York State

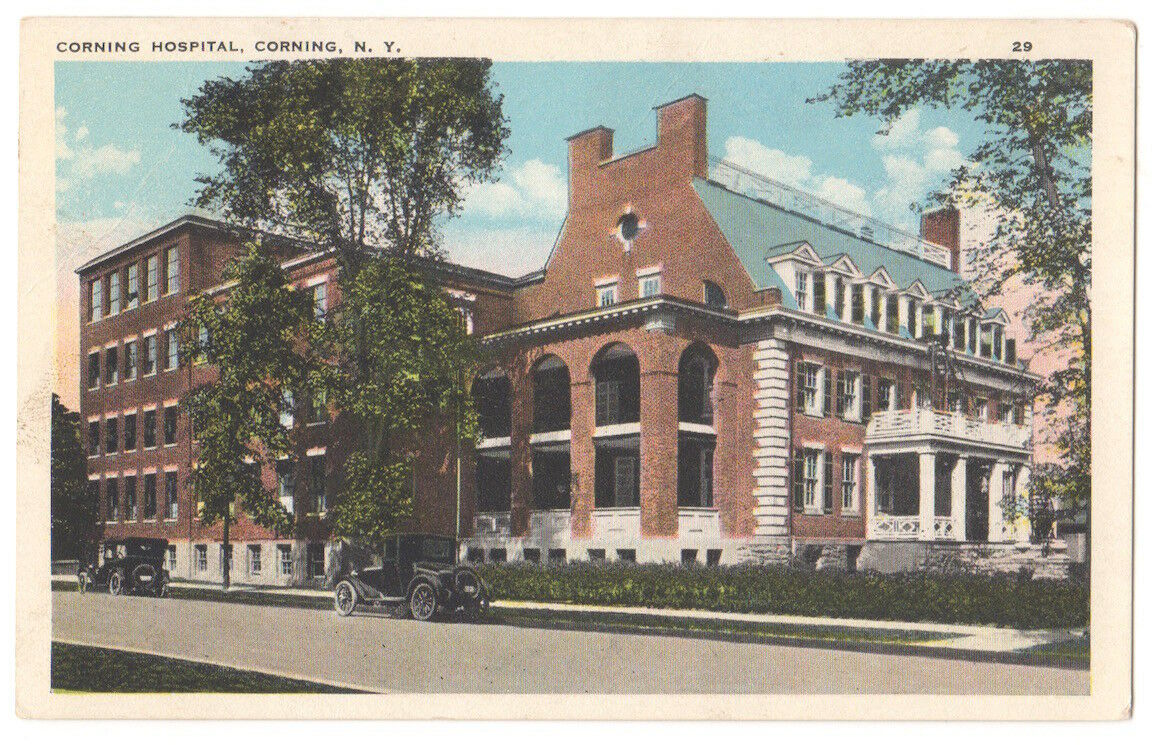
Corning Hospital circa 1920, after the first major renovation

The Guthrie Corning Hospital is a rural hospital and Level III trauma center in Corning, New York. It opened June 4, 1900 at the Stearns House at East First and Chemung Streets. This was after a January 25 meeting at which the woman of the city considered organizing a hospital association. It initially opened with 9 beds, but today has 65 private patient rooms at the new facility opened in July, 2014, ten years after being acquired by Guthrie. In the transition, the hospital built the Guthrie Corning Cancer Center, a physical rehabilitation building, Guthrie HealthWorks Wellness & Fitness Center, and a same day surgicenter in Big Flats, New York. It received a provisional trauma center designation August 28, 2023.

== Awards and Distinctions ==
- Center of Distinction award for Wound Care Center (2018) from Healogics
- Get With The Guidelines Stroke Gold Quality Achievement Award (multiple, 2020) from American Heart Association/American Stroke Association
- America's Best Hospitals for Mammogram Imaging Center award (2022) from Women's Choice Award
- C-Section Delivery 5 star rating (2022) from Healthgrades
- Leapfrog Hospital Safety Grade "A" (2022) from Leapfrog Group
- Get With The Guidelines Rural Acute Stroke Bronze Award (2023) from American Heart Association/American Stroke Association
- Get With The Guidelines Stroke: Silver Plus Achievement (multiple, 2023) from American Heart Association/American Stroke Association
- Great Community Hospitals (2023) from Becker's Hospital Review
- Target Stroke Honor Roll (multiple, 2023) from American Heart Association
- Target Type 2 Diabetes Honor Roll (multiple, latest 2023) from American Heart Association
