= Market Street Historic District (Corning, New York) =

Historic district in New York, United States

- U.S. National Register of Historic Places
- U.S. Historic district
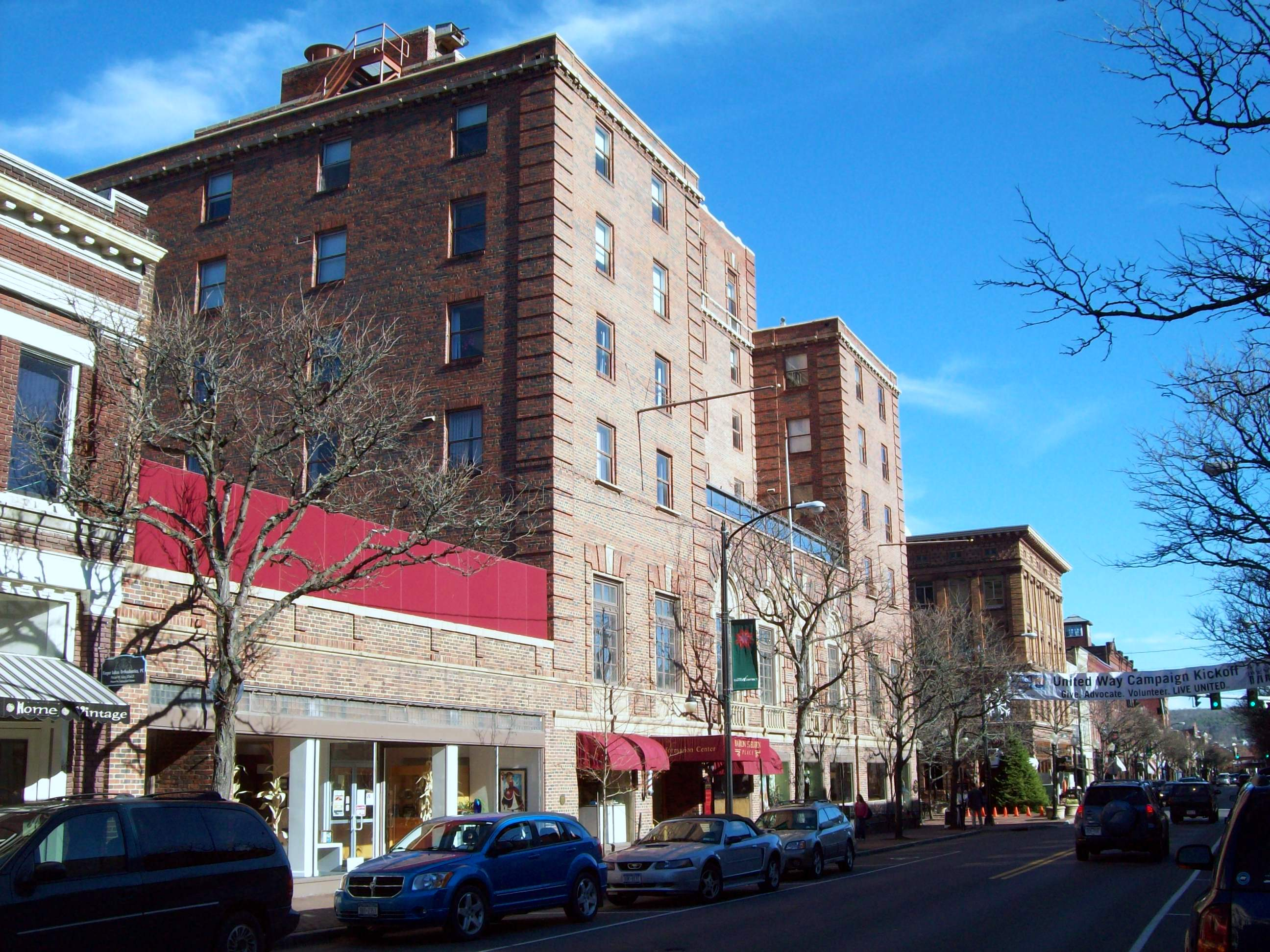
- Market Street Historic District, November 2010

- Location within New York Location within the United States
- Location: Market St. from Chestnut St. to Wall St. (original), and N side of Market St. from Chestnut St. and Bridge St. (increase), Corning, New York
- Coordinates: 42°8′35″N 77°3′14″W
- Built: 1859
- Architect: Tuthill; A.J. Warner (original)
- Architectural style: Greek Revival, Italianate (increase)
- NRHP reference No.: 74001307 (original); 00001152 (increase)
- Added to NRHP: March 1, 1974 (original); October 6, 2000 (increase)

Market Street Historic District is a historic district located at Corning in Steuben County, New York.

It was originally listed on the National Register of Historic Places in 1974 and its boundaries were increased in 2000.
