= Caroline Ella Heminway Kierstead =

American geologist and micropaleontologist

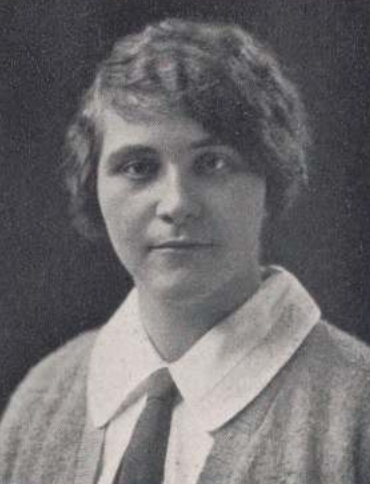
- Caroline Ella Heminway, from the 1925 yearbook of Mount Holyoke College
- Born: July 12, 1904; Corning, New York
- Died: June 17, 1985 (aged 80)
- Occupation(s): Geologist, micropaleontologist

Caroline Ella Heminway Kierstead (July 12, 1904 – June 17, 1985) was an American geologist and micropaleontologist who was a professor of geology at Smith College in Massachusetts, a Shell Oil Company paleontologist, and a scientist whose micropaleontology specialty was research on foraminifera.

== Early life and education ==
Caroline Ella Heminway Kierstead was born in Corning, New York, to parents Herbert A. and Ella May (Daley) Heminway, on July 12, 1904. Her father was an attorney, as was her sister Marion L. Heminway.

Kierstead attended many institutions throughout her life. In 1925, she graduated from Mount Holyoke College with a major in Philosophy and Psychology, and a minor in Geology. She then took her master's degree at Cornell University, and graduated in 1928. From there, she went on to earn a PhD in 1941 at Indiana University. Aside from her major degrees, she also studied at the University of Colorado, Syracuse University, and the University of Wyoming.

== Career ==
In 1928, Kierstead joined the faculty of Smith College in Massachusetts, where she spent most of her teaching career, ascending from instructor to full professor at 1964. She also served as a dean for the class of 1944. Furthermore, she was elected as chair of the geology department at the college in 1946, and served until 1952. Kierstead retired from her post at Smith College in 1969.

While a member of the Smith College geology department, Kierstead guided a group from the Geology Department of the Carnegie Institute in Washington, D.C., to study magnetic materials in the lavas and the glacial lake sediments in the Connecticut valley region. The expedition was run by Dr. Ellis A. Johnson and aided by use of a mobile laboratory.

In 1943, during World War II, Kierstead took a leave of absence from her job, and, bringing along two Smith College graduates, took a job at the Shell Oil Company, where she would work as a paleontologist until 1945.

During a sabbatical in 1947, Kierstead studied foraminifera in three core samples taken from the Ross Sea, Antarctica during Operation Highjump, a US Navy operation.

== Personal life ==
Heminway married electrical engineer Friend Hans Kierstead in 1947.

Outside of work, Kierstead was known to be a breeder and exhibitor of Pembroke Welsh Corgi dogs. Her dogs won numerous American Kennel Club championships. Additionally, she also participated in many dog clubs. Kierstead was acting president of the Mayflower Pembroke Welsh Corgi Club from its founding in 1977 until 1981, hosting the club's first breeding match in October of 1977, and having an annual trophy named in her honor following her death.

Kierstead died on June 17, 1985, in Goshen, Hampshire, Massachusetts, US. There is a collection of her papers from 1923 to 1985 at Smith College Libraries, including scientific journals, as well as research notes, correspondence, diaries and lectures.
