= First Baptist Church of Painted Post =

Historic church in New York, United States

- U.S. National Register of Historic Places
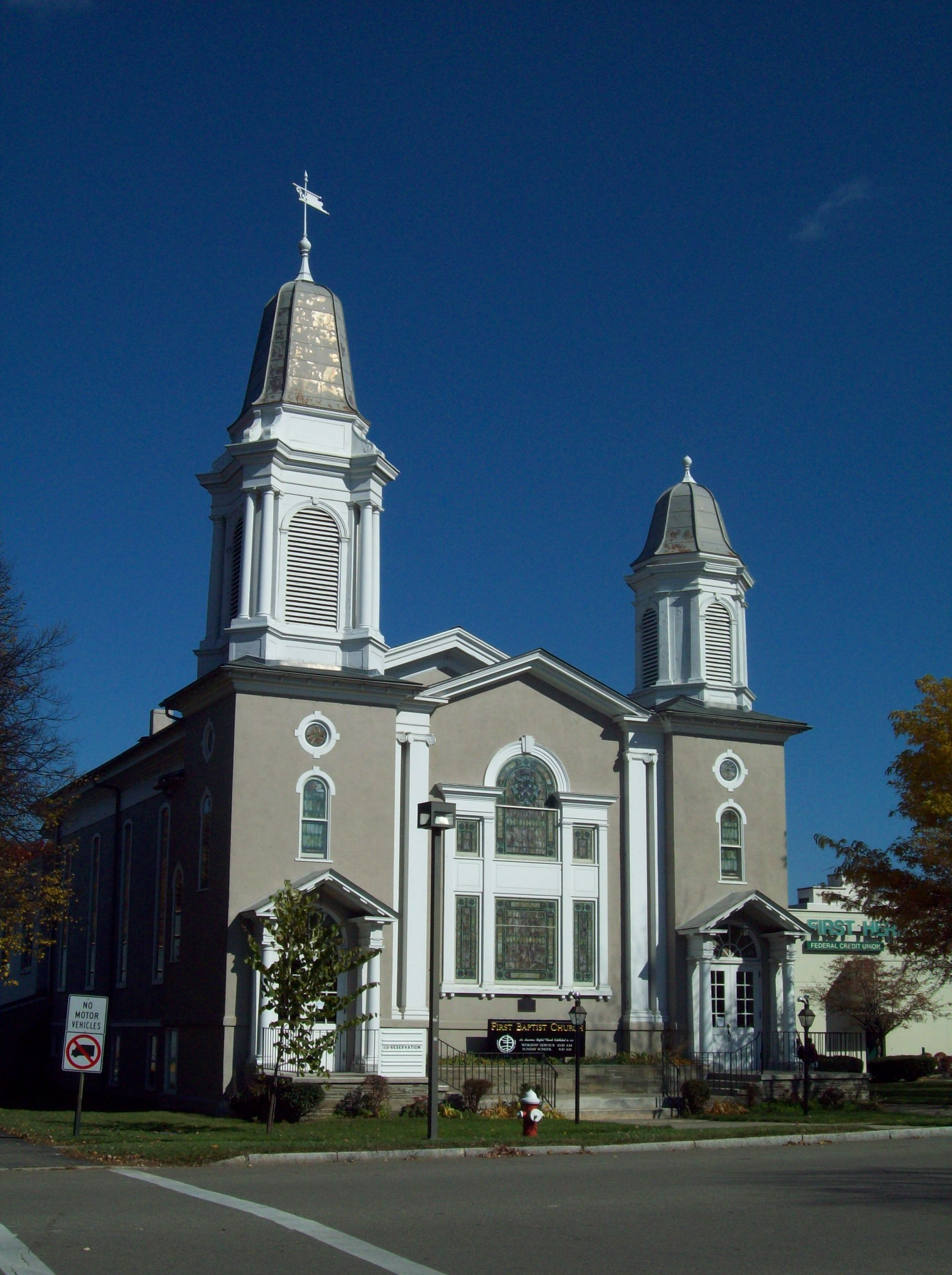
- First Baptist Church of Painted Post, October 2009

- Location within New York Location within the United States
- Location: 130 W. Water St., Painted Post, New York
- Coordinates: 42°9′30″N 77°5′40″W
- Area: less than one acre
- Built: 1915
- Architect: Pierce & Bickford
- Architectural style: Renaissance
- NRHP reference No.: 99000088
- Added to NRHP: February 5, 1999

First Baptist Church of Painted Post is a historic Baptist church located at Painted Post in Steuben County, New York. The church was originally built in 1860 and expanded and remodeled in 1915 by architects Pierce & Bickford after a fire destroyed the mid-19th century building's tower and spire. The three-part church consists of the main block—a 40-foot-wide (12 m), 60-foot-deep (18 m), gable-roofed edifice built in 1860 and now containing the sanctuary; the front wing—a 40-foot-wide (12 m), 12-foot-deep (3.7 m) addition built in 1915 and now containing the foyer and narthex; and a noncontributing rear addition. The front wing features two massive square corner towers surmounted by louvered bell towers and bell curved roofs.

It was listed on the National Register of Historic Places in 1999.
