= Little Joe Tower =

U.S. landmark

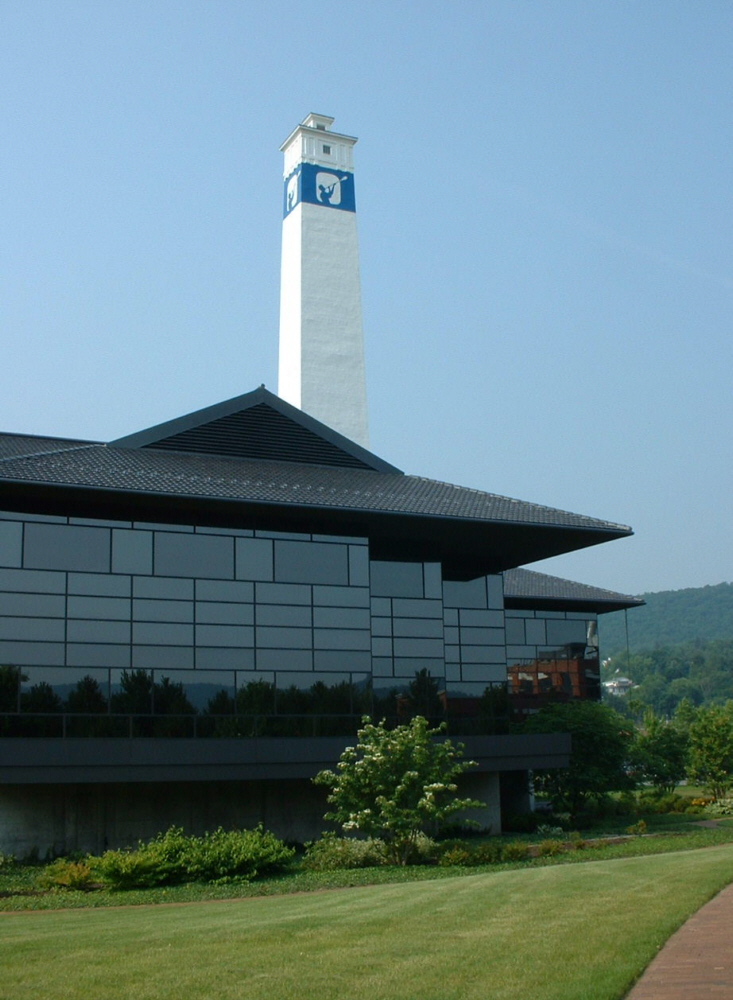
- Little Joe Tower, seen behind Corning's headquarters.

- Location within New York Little Joe Tower (the United States)

General information
- Location: Corning, New York, United States
- Coordinates: 42°08′42.9108″N 77°03′27.738″W
- Completed: 1912 or 1913
- Owner: Corning Inc.

Height
- Height: 187 feet (57 m)

Little Joe Tower is a landmark structure in Corning, New York, United States.

The tower was built in either 1912 or 1913 by Corning Glass Works (now known as Corning Incorporated). The construction came during a period of growth for the company, and the 187-foot (57 m) tower was used in drawing glass for thermometer tubes. To create the thermometers, in a process known as "vertical draw", the heated glass was pulled up the length of the tower using a cable, to form a continuous tube that was later cooled and cut to required sizes. By the 1940s, advancements in drawing technology reduced the use of the tower, and in June 1973, the tower was decommissioned. However, the company continues to maintain the building, which the Star-Gazette claims is "the Corning area's best known landmark".

On the outside of the white tower is a blue stenciled silhouette of "Little Joe", a glassblower, giving the tower its name. The symbol of the gaffer, or glassblower, was originally created in 1880 from a sketch made by an itinerant painter who has visited a glass factory in Pittsburgh, Pennsylvania. The symbol has undergone various modifications over time, and has become a Corning Inc. trademark.

In 1999, the tower was repainted, and in 2015, the tower experienced a renovation that began in May and ended in August.
