= Corning, New York =

- City
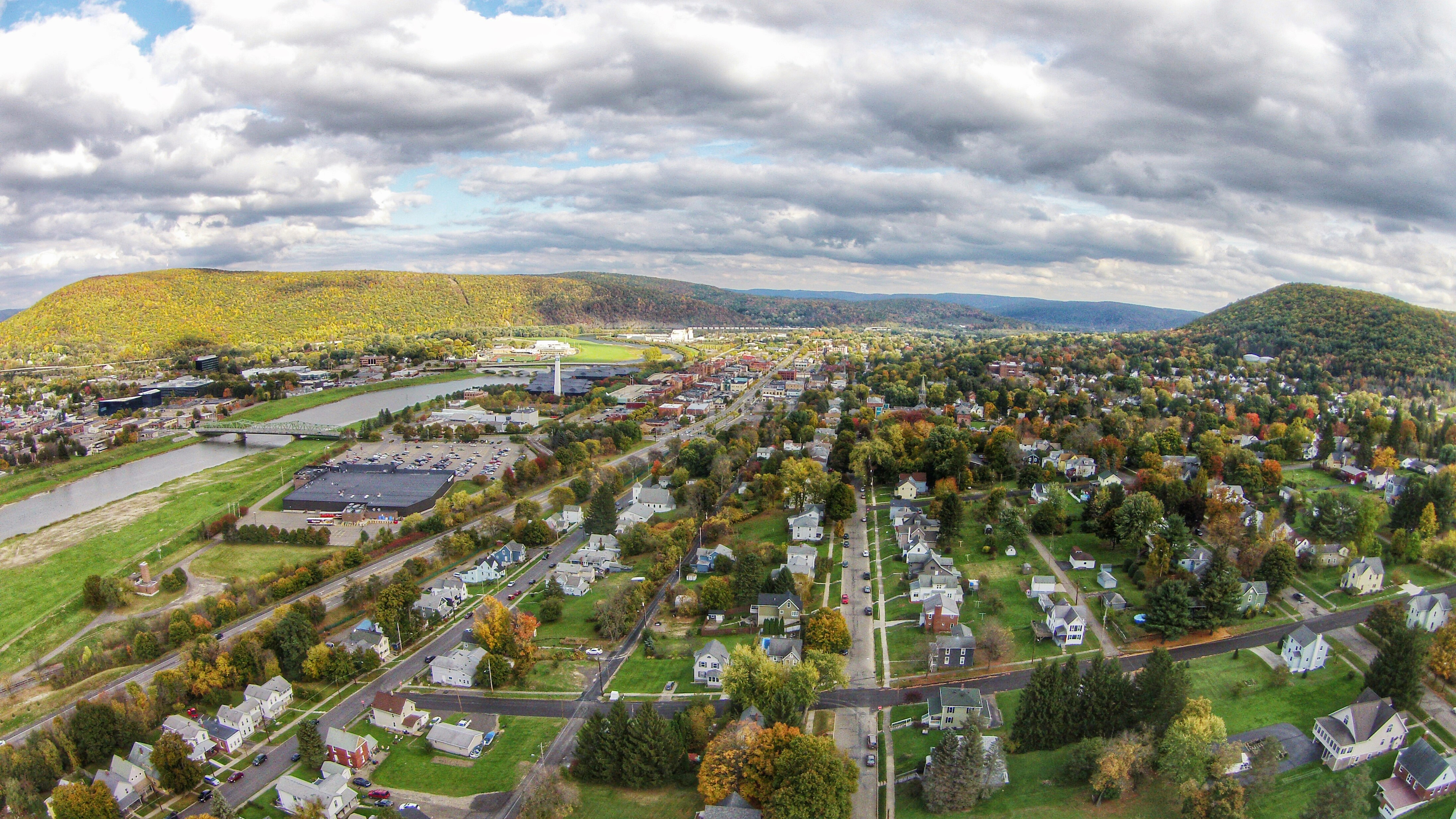

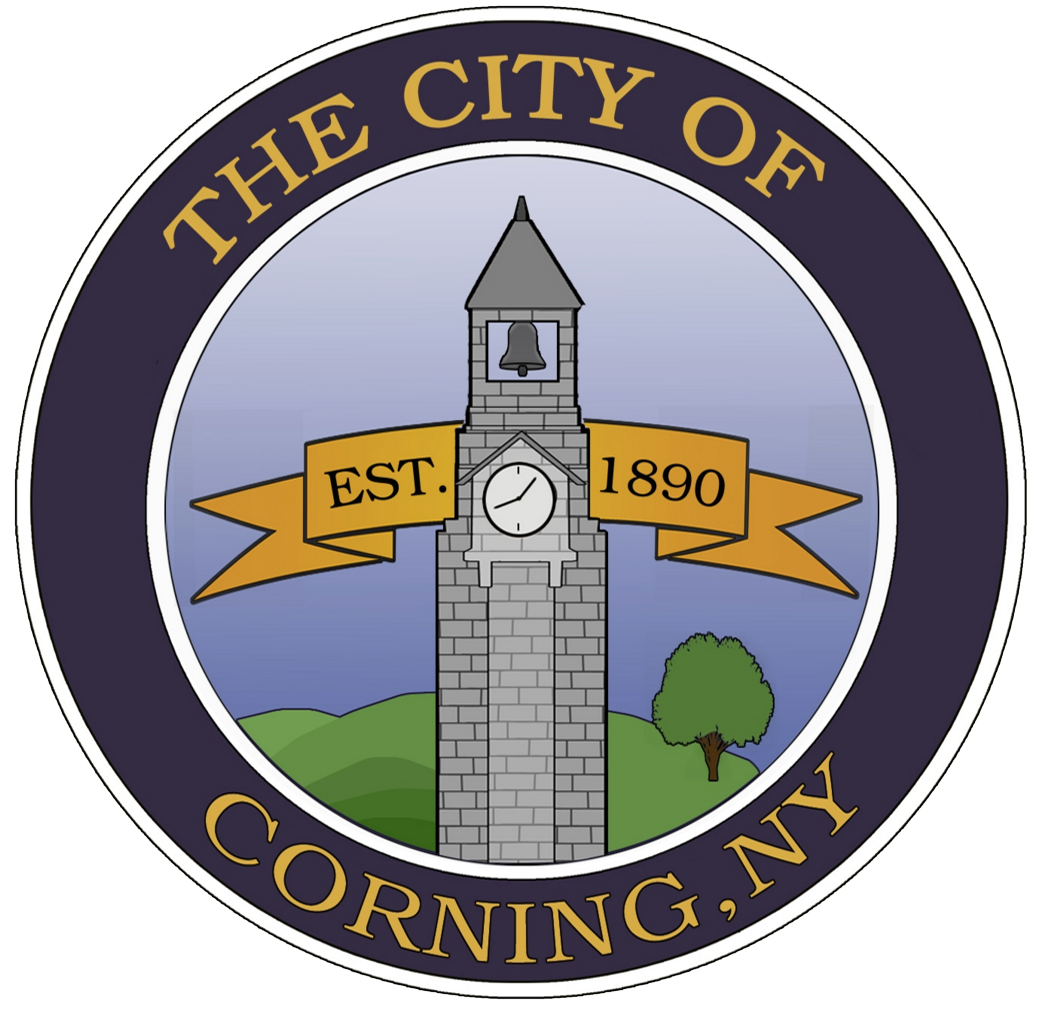
- Seal
- Nickname: Crystal City
- Location within the state of New York Corning, New York (the United States)
- Coordinates: 42°8′53″N 77°3′25″W
- Country: United States
- State: New York
- County: Steuben
- Established: 1796

Government
  - Type: Council-Manager
  - Mayor: Pamela G. Walker
  - City Manager: Mark L. Ryckman
  - City Council: Members' List: • W1: Diane Telehany; • W2: Kate Paterson; • W3: Deputy Mayor Jeffrey M. Clark; • W4: Marshall Hyde; • W6: Betty J. Coccho; • W7: Rodi Rovner; • W8: Alison Hunt

Area
  - Total: 3.26 sq mi (8.45 km^{2})
  - Land: 3.08 sq mi (7.99 km^{2})
  - Water: 0.18 sq mi (0.46 km^{2})
- Elevation: 932 ft (284 m)

Population (2020)
  - Total: 10,551
  - Density: 3,421.5/sq mi (1,321.04/km^{2})
- Time zone: UTC−5 (Eastern (EST))
  - Summer (DST): UTC−4 (EDT)
- ZIP codes: 14830-14831
- Area code: 607
- FIPS code: 36-18256
- GNIS feature ID: 0947476
- Website: Corning, New York

Corning is a city in Steuben County, New York, United States, on the Chemung River. The population was 10,551 at the 2020 census. It is named for Erastus Corning, an Albany financier and railroad executive who was an investor in the company that developed the community. The city is best known as the headquarters of Fortune 500 company Corning Incorporated, formerly Corning Glass Works, a manufacturer of glass and ceramic products for industrial, scientific and technical uses. Corning is roughly equidistant from New York City and Toronto, being about 220 miles (350 km) from both.

== Overview ==
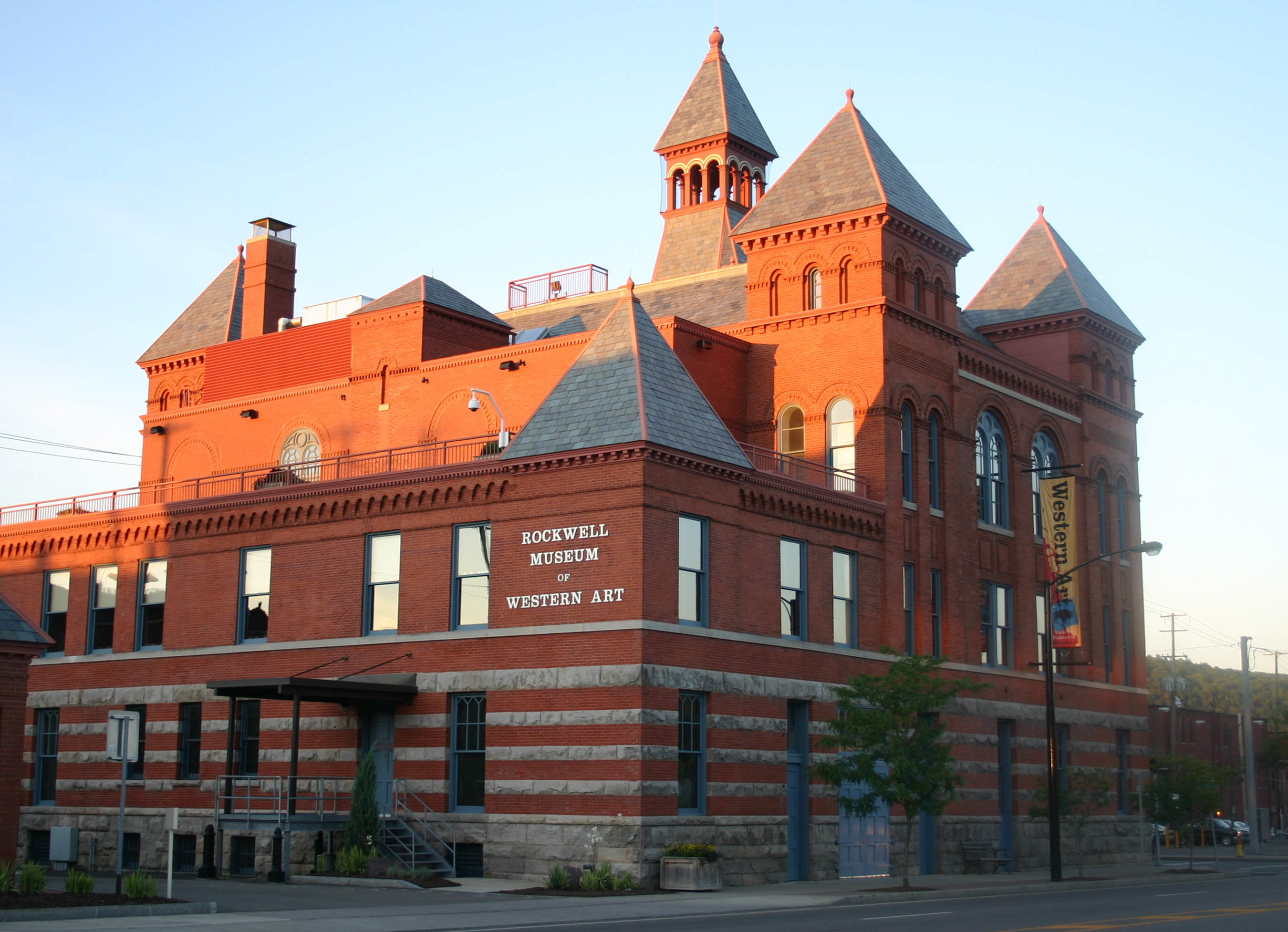
Rockwell Museum

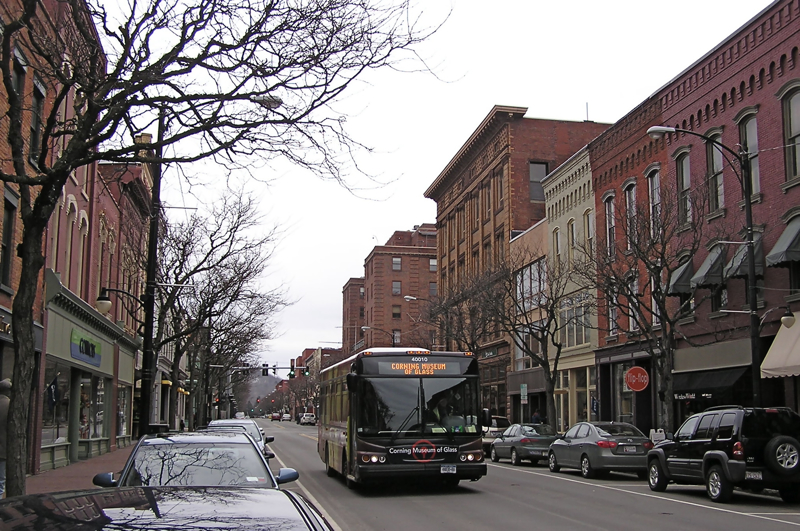
Market Street in Corning's Gaffer District.

The city of Corning is situated at the western edge of the town of Corning and in the southeast part of Steuben County.

It is also home to the Corning Museum of Glass, which houses one of the world's most comprehensive collections of glass objects from antiquity to the present. The museum houses the Rakow Library, one of the world's major glass research centers.

The city's other major cultural attraction is the Rockwell Museum. It contains an important collection of Western American painting and sculpture assembled over the past 40 years by Robert F. and Hertha Rockwell. The city has been cited several times by American Style magazine as one of the top twenty-five small city arts destinations in the U.S. – most recently in June 2010. Many of the cultural events and historic landmarks in the city are in Corning's Gaffer District.

Corning Country Club annually hosted the Corning Classic, a stop on the Ladies Professional Golf Association tour, from 1979 to 2009. The event is slated to return as "The Classic" in 2027. The city has commercial air service available at Elmira/Corning Regional Airport in the nearby town of Big Flats.

Corning is also home to the 2006 New York State Class A high school football champions.

In 2006, the city council approved public water fluoridation. In 2007, a petition was launched to ban this practice by local resident Kirk Huttleston which eventually became known as Proposition 1. Proposition 1 passed the ban by a close vote of 1,287 to 1,222, according to unofficial results, leading to a full ban on public water fluoridation in 2008.

In 2013, Rand McNally's list of best small towns in America named Corning the "Most Fun" town out of all the list's finalists.

== History ==
The first settlement in the town of Corning was made near the site of the future city in 1796. The community was incorporated as a village in 1848. Corning was incorporated as a city in 1890. As the glass industry developed, Corning became known as the "Crystal City" which was supported by companies such as Hawkes, Sinclair, and Hunt - which produced some of the finest American Brilliant Period cut glass between 1880 and 1915.

The Corning area's first real industry was lumber. The first settlers used the area's river systems to transport logs and finished lumber in fleets downstream to buyers. This gave rise to large mills which helped to develop the area. Rafting of lumber began to wane as timber was depleted. At one time the mills of the Corning area were reputed to be among the biggest in the world. After the lumber was depleted the great mills moved north to new forests.

East, across the Chemung River from Corning, lies Gibson, the site of a feeder canal for the Chemung Canal system. Some of Corning's early prosperity came from the feeder canal system exposure. Canal cargoes from Corning included soft coal, timber, tobacco, grain, and whiskey. From April 22 to December 11, 1850, the canal season that year, the newspaper reported that 1,116 boats left the port of Corning. Tolls for the year totaled $54,060.39. Among items shipped were 46,572,400 pounds of coal. The canal's best peacetime year was 1854 when 270,978 tons of freight were hauled. The Civil War brought an abnormal amount of business, with a peak of 307,151 tons hauled in one year.

After the Civil War, an industrial boom occurred in the region. Ingersoll Rand opened during this period in Painted Post, just north of Corning.

Corning became a railroad town in the 1880s, many smaller railroad lines busily weaving webs of tracks connecting the major trunk line to smaller communities. In 1912, the Corning train wreck three miles east of Corning in Gibson left 39 dead.

The Jenning's Tavern, Corning Armory, Market Street Historic District, Southside Historic District, World War Memorial Library, and United States Post Office are listed on the National Register of Historic Places.

=== The flood of 1972 ===
The flood of 1972 was a major event for the area. On June 22, 1972, the storm that had been Hurricane Agnes struck the Southern Tier of New York. The storm combined with a storm system from Ohio to drop six to eight inches (200 mm) of rain in the Chemung River basin. This ultimately overwhelmed the flood control systems of the time, and the Chemung River broke through the dam system on Friday, June 23 at 4:00 a.m. By 9:00 a.m. the river crested and began to recede. In the Corning area, eighteen people were killed and untold millions of dollars of damage was incurred. The river receded within hours, leaving mud which can still be found in basements of homes and businesses in Corning, and there is a section of the Corning Museum of Glass that indicates on the wall how high the flood waters rose.

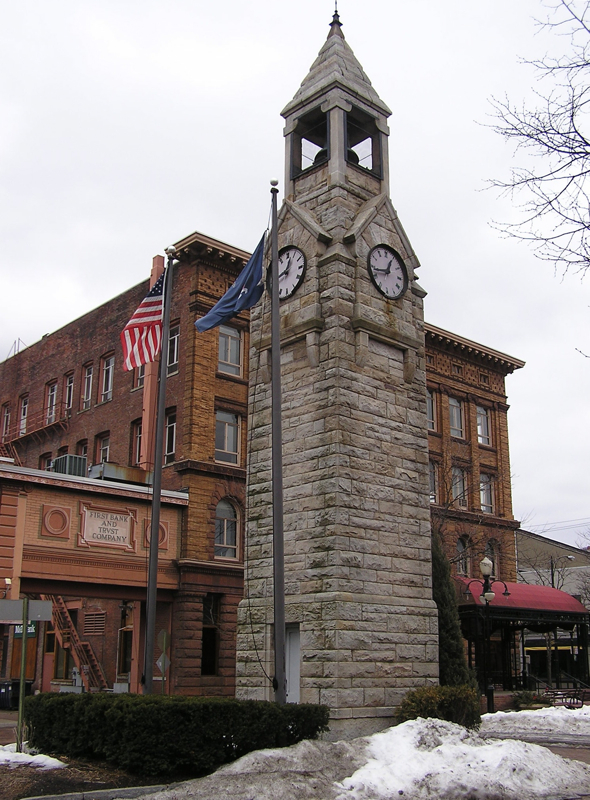
Corning Clock Tower at Market and Pine Streets in downtown Corning.

== Geography ==
Just upstream from Corning, the Cohocton River and the Tioga River merge to form the Chemung River which flows through downtown. The river was an important source of power in the early history, and is part of the attractiveness of the region today.

The river is prone to floods, as rain water runs off quickly from the steep hillsides of the area. In 1972 the remnants of Hurricane Agnes dropped fifteen or more inches of rain in the area within a short time causing extensive flooding. Eighteen people were killed in the immediate Corning-Painted Post area. The entire downtown area was flooded, with severe damage. Flooding is now controlled by a system of dams upstream from Corning.

I-86 (the Southern Tier Expressway), NY 17, NY 352, NY 414, and NY 415 are major highways connecting in Corning. County Road 40 leads into the city from the south and County Road 41 from the north. I-99 and US 15 proceeds southward from Painted Post, west of Corning.

According to the United States Census Bureau, the city has a total area of 3.3 square miles (8.5 km^{2}), of which, 3.1 square miles (8.0 km^{2}) of it is land and 0.2 square miles (0.52 km^{2}) of it (5.18%) is water.

=== Climate ===
Climate data for Corning, New York (1991–2020 normals, extremes 1992–present)
Month	Jan	Feb	Mar	Apr	May	Jun	Jul	Aug	Sep	Oct	Nov	Dec	Year
Record high °F (°C)	66 (19)	71 (22)	86 (30)	91 (33)	94 (34)	95 (35)	98 (37)	100 (38)	97 (36)	84 (29)	76 (24)	69 (21)	100 (38)
Mean maximum °F (°C)	52.0 (11.1)	51.3 (10.7)	62.6 (17.0)	77.9 (25.5)	86.7 (30.4)	87.3 (30.7)	89.7 (32.1)	86.1 (30.1)	84.7 (29.3)	74.5 (23.6)	64.8 (18.2)	53.7 (12.1)	90.9 (32.7)
Mean daily maximum °F (°C)	29.5 (−1.4)	32.6 (0.3)	41.5 (5.3)	55.2 (12.9)	67.6 (19.8)	74.9 (23.8)	79.1 (26.2)	77.2 (25.1)	70.1 (21.2)	57.7 (14.3)	44.9 (7.2)	34.2 (1.2)	55.4 (13.0)
Daily mean °F (°C)	20.8 (−6.2)	22.7 (−5.2)	30.5 (−0.8)	42.9 (6.1)	54.6 (12.6)	62.8 (17.1)	67.1 (19.5)	65.6 (18.7)	58.4 (14.7)	46.9 (8.3)	35.8 (2.1)	26.7 (−2.9)	44.6 (7.0)
Mean daily minimum °F (°C)	12.2 (−11.0)	12.8 (−10.7)	19.6 (−6.9)	30.5 (−0.8)	41.6 (5.3)	50.6 (10.3)	55.1 (12.8)	54.0 (12.2)	46.7 (8.2)	36.2 (2.3)	26.6 (−3.0)	19.2 (−7.1)	33.8 (1.0)
Mean minimum °F (°C)	−5.3 (−20.7)	−5.5 (−20.8)	2.3 (−16.5)	18.5 (−7.5)	27.3 (−2.6)	37.6 (3.1)	45.0 (7.2)	44.0 (6.7)	34.9 (1.6)	25.2 (−3.8)	13.7 (−10.2)	5.5 (−14.7)	−9.6 (−23.1)
Record low °F (°C)	−20 (−29)	−18 (−28)	−15 (−26)	6 (−14)	22 (−6)	33 (1)	39 (4)	41 (5)	26 (−3)	20 (−7)	−1 (−18)	−13 (−25)	−20 (−29)
Average precipitation inches (mm)	2.34 (59)	1.92 (49)	2.99 (76)	3.37 (86)	3.05 (77)	4.18 (106)	3.69 (94)	3.86 (98)	4.18 (106)	3.60 (91)	2.85 (72)	2.66 (68)	38.69 (983)
Average snowfall inches (cm)	11.8 (30)	11.3 (29)	13.6 (35)	2.2 (5.6)	0.0 (0.0)	0.0 (0.0)	0.0 (0.0)	0.0 (0.0)	0.0 (0.0)	0.2 (0.51)	4.1 (10)	10.0 (25)	53.2 (135)
Average extreme snow depth inches (cm)	6.9 (18)	8.1 (21)	9.8 (25)	1.7 (4.3)	0.0 (0.0)	0.0 (0.0)	0.0 (0.0)	0.0 (0.0)	0.0 (0.0)	0.1 (0.25)	2.3 (5.8)	5.0 (13)	13.5 (34)
Average precipitation days (≥ 0.01 in)	14.8	11.8	13.3	14.1	14.0	13.6	12.7	12.2	11.6	14.2	13.6	15.3	161.2
Average snowy days (≥ 0.1 in)	11.1	9.4	7.1	1.9	0.0	0.0	0.0	0.0	0.0	0.2	3.5	8.7	41.9
Source: NOAA (mean maxima/minima 2006–2020)

== Demographics ==
=== 2020 census ===
As of the 2020 census, Corning had a population of 10,551. The median age was 38.3 years. 20.1% of residents were under the age of 18 and 16.6% of residents were 65 years of age or older. For every 100 females there were 96.8 males, and for every 100 females age 18 and over there were 95.2 males age 18 and over.

100.0% of residents lived in urban areas, while 0.0% lived in rural areas.

There were 5,046 households in Corning, of which 23.1% had children under the age of 18 living in them. Of all households, 30.5% were married-couple households, 26.7% were households with a male householder and no spouse or partner present, and 33.0% were households with a female householder and no spouse or partner present. About 43.1% of all households were made up of individuals and 14.1% had someone living alone who was 65 years of age or older.

There were 5,676 housing units, of which 11.1% were vacant. The homeowner vacancy rate was 3.0% and the rental vacancy rate was 10.1%.

Racial composition as of the 2020 census
Race	Number	Percent
White	9,118	86.4%
Black or African American	337	3.2%
American Indian and Alaska Native	38	0.4%
Asian	282	2.7%
Native Hawaiian and Other Pacific Islander	3	0.0%
Some other race	132	1.3%
Two or more races	641	6.1%
Hispanic or Latino (of any race)	345	3.3%

=== 2010 census ===
As of the 2010 census, there were 11,183 people in 5,114 households residing in the city. The population density was 3,626.1 inhabitants per square mile (1,400.0/km^{2}). There were 5,519 housing units. The racial makeup of the city was 91.8% White, 3.2% Black or African American, 0.3% Native American, 1.8% Asian, Hispanic or Latino of any race were 2.4% of the population. 4.1% speak a language other than English at home.

In 2010, 20.4% were below the poverty line.

=== 2000 census ===
In 2000, there were 4,996 households, out of which 26.2% had children under the age of 18 living with them, 37.6% were married couples living together, 12.3% had a female householder with no husband present, and 46.6% were non-families. 40.1% of all households were made up of individuals, and 15.5% had someone living alone who was 65 years of age or older. The average household size was 2.14 and the average family size was 2.89.

In the city, the population was spread out, with 23.3% under the age of 18, 8.6% from 18 to 24, 29.2% from 25 to 44, 21.1% from 45 to 64, and 17.8% who were 65 years of age or older. The median age was 38 years. For every 100 females, there were 87.5 males. For every 100 females age 18 and over, there were 83.5 males.

The median income for a household in the city was $32,780, and the median income for a family was $46,674. Males had a median income of $39,805 versus $27,489 for females. The per capita income for the city was $22,056. About 9.1% of families and 13.0% of the population were below the poverty line, including 18.4% of those under age 18 and 3.8% of those age 65 or over.

Historical population
Census	Pop.	Note	%±
1870	4,018		—
1880	4,802		19.5%
1890	8,590		78.9%
1900	11,061		28.8%
1910	13,730		24.1%
1920	15,820		15.2%
1930	15,777		−0.3%
1940	16,212		2.8%
1950	17,684		9.1%
1960	17,085		−3.4%
1970	15,792		−7.6%
1980	12,953		−18.0%
1990	11,938		−7.8%
2000	10,842		−9.2%
2010	11,183		3.1%
2020	10,551		−5.7%
Sources: 1790–1950, 1960–1980, 1990–2000

== Politics ==
While the town of Corning and surrounding areas lean Republican, the city of Corning leans Democratic, voting for both Barack Obama and Hillary Clinton in recent presidential elections.

=== City mayors ===
Democrat Joseph Nasser served for many years as Corning's mayor, and the Nasser Civic Center, headquarters of city government, bears his name. On November 6, 2007, Tom Reed, the head of the city's Republican Party, was elected. He completed his two-year term on December 31, 2009. Pamela Walker, the first female mayor of Corning, was elected in November 2025.

=== State representatives ===
It is in New York's 53rd Senate District, represented by Tom O'Mara, a Republican. Corning is in the 136th Assembly District, represented by Phil Palmesano, also a Republican.

=== Federal representatives ===
Corning is in New York's 23rd congressional district, which is currently represented by Republican Nick Langworthy. Amo Houghton, the area's long-serving U.S. congressman, was a moderate Republican.

== Government ==
Since 1995, the City of Corning has operated under the Council-Manager form of government, with the City Manager serving as the chief executive officer. The first City Manager was Suzanne Kennedy, who served until July 1997. In July 1997, Mark L. Ryckman was appointed as the city's second City Manager. The city council consists of eight members. One member is elected from each of the eight wards.

== Education ==
The Corning-Painted Post (Consists of the City of Corning, and the Village of Painted Post) School District currently has six public elementary schools, one public middle school, and one public high school located in the greater Corning area.

In 2010 a referendum was passed that reconfigured the school district's secondary schools; both of the previous middle schools combined and moved into the former "West High School" building while both of the high schools combined at the former "East High School" campus. This reconfiguration / building project was finished by the beginning of the 2014–2015 school year.

In addition to the public and private school options, the Corning-Painted Post District also partners with a regional P-Tech school (known as "The Greater Southern Tier STEM Academy") and sends selected students to a grade 9-14 program on their campus.

Public elementary schools include:

- Calvin U. Smith
- Erwin Valley
- Frederick Carder
- Hugh W. Gregg
- Lindley-Presho (closed)
- William E. Severn
- Winfield Street

Public middle schools include:

- Corning Free Academy (Before 2014–2015 school year)
- Corning Painted Post Middle School (After 2013–current)
- Northside Blodgett (Before 2014–2015 school year)

Public high schools include:

- Corning Painted Post High School (After 2013–current)
- East High School (Before 2014–2015 school year)
- High School Learning Center (HSLC)
- West High School (Before 2014–2015 school year)

Private schools in Corning include:

- All Saints Academy (a preK–8 Catholic school)(Closed)
- Corning Christian Academy (a P–12 evangelical Christian school)
- The Alternative School for Math and Science (ASMS)

Higher education in Corning includes:

- Corning Community College

== Places of interest ==
=== Downtown ===
- Corning Museum of Glass: a not-for-profit museum dedicated to the art, history, science, and craft of glass.
- The Gaffer District is the historic heart of Corning, featuring restored buildings, shopping, dining, and events through the year.
  - Market Street is Corning's historic main street, lined with restaurants and shopping.
  - The heart of Market Street is Centerway Square, a pedestrianized central square with a covered bandstand and public benches for public concerts and events. A restored historic clock tower serves as Centerway Square's focal point.

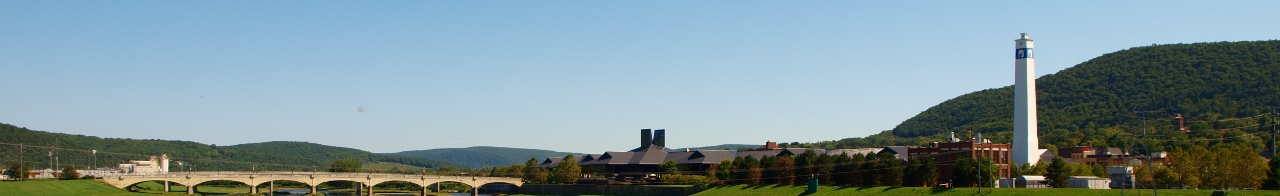
A view of Corning's Gaffer District across the Chemung River.

==== External links ====
- Corning's Gaffer District
- The Buildings Alive! Historic & Architectural Walking Tour

=== Elsewhere in Corning ===
- Bloody Run – An area near Gorton Creek, it was the site of a battle between forces of American generals John Sullivan and James Clinton and Native American villagers. This battle was part of a campaign directly ordered by George Washington to break the control of the Iroquois Indians in the area. It was called Bloody Run for the reports of bloody creek water coming from the battle scene.
- Chimney Rocks – A group of tall rock formations that stood east of Corning. The rocks are no longer there but were so named because they were tall and narrow like chimneys.
- Heritage Village of the Southern Finger Lakes – Right in the heart of Corning, the Heritage Village is a Living History museum and the site of the Benjamin Patterson Inn, constructed in 1796 to draw settlers to the area. The site also includes a functioning blacksmith shop, one room school house, and an 1850s era log cabin.
- Horace D. Page Tunnel – A tunnel connecting the two divided areas of Denison Park, located on the city's South side. It was named after Page, who lost the naming rights to Elmira's Millers (formerly Page's) Pond in a 1912 horse racing bet at Tioga Downs, and was given naming rights to the tunnel as compensation.

== Gallery ==
Corning's Little Joe Tower

Corning

Corning

== Notable people ==
- Thomas S. Buechner – artist who became the founding director of the Corning Museum of Glass
- Frederick Carder – glassmaker, glass designer, and glass artist
- Joseph Costa – aviation pioneer
- Duane Eddy – Grammy Award-winning rock and roll guitarist
- Edd Hall – television personality and announcer
- Alanson B. Houghton – businessman, politician, and diplomat who served as a congressman and ambassador
- Amory "Amo" Houghton Jr. – politician
- Amory Houghton – United States ambassador to France
- James R. Houghton – businessman who was chairman of Corning Inc.
- Katharine Houghton Hepburn – social reformer and a leader of the suffrage movement in the United States; mother of Katharine Hepburn
- John N. Hungerford – banker, philanthropist, and politician who served as a United States Congressman
- Greg Keagle – MLB player
- Caroline Ella Heminway Kierstead – geologist
- Harvey Littleton – glass artist and educator
- Eric Massa – politician who served as a United States Congressman
- Tom Reed – lobbyist, attorney, and politician who served as a United States Congressman
- Margaret Sanger – birth control activist, sex educator, writer, and nurse; founder of Planned Parenthood
- Samuel Sevian – chess prodigy and grandmaster
- John Tillman – lacrosse coach; currently the head coach for the University of Maryland Terrapins men's lacrosse team
- Charles C. B. Walker – politician who served as a United States Congressman
- Christi Wolf – champion female bodybuilder and professional wrestler best known for her stint in World Championship Wrestling

== Sister cities ==
Corning has three sister cities, as designated by Sister Cities International:

- Kakegawa, Shizuoka, Japan (formerly Osuka, which was annexed by Kakegawa)
- Lviv, Ukraine
- San Giovanni Valdarno, Tuscany, Italy

== See also ==
- Corning (town), New York
- Corning Inc.
- Corning Museum of Glass
- Houghton family
- Steuben Glass Works
