= Amy Jones (artist) =

American painter (1899–1992)

- 1941
- Born: Amy A. White; April 4, 1899; Buffalo, New York
- Died: October 8, 1992 (aged 93); Escondido, California
- Other names: Amy White Jones, Amy Jones Frisbie
- Occupation: artist
- Years active: 1928–1992
- Known for: public art and murals

Amy Jones (1899–1992) was an American artist and muralist in the early 20th century. She was one of the founding members of the Saranac Lake Art League. Though most known for her watercolors, like Sandy Acre which is in the permanent collection of the Smithsonian American Art Museum, Jones also did illustration work for magazines and books. She won national competitions to complete post office murals for the post offices in Winsted, Connecticut; Painted Post, New York; and Scotia, New York. Several major U.S. corporations hold over twenty of her works.

== Early life ==
Amy A. White was born April 4, 1899 in Buffalo, New York. Her mother, Carrie or Clara White was born in Canada and her father, Squire White was a New York native. White's father had died by 1910 and she and her mother were living in Brooklyn. (Note: White and her mother resided at 258 Ryerson, Brooklyn in the 1910 and 1920 census records, which is the same address given for the marriage license of White to Jones.) White attended Erasmus Hall High School, graduating in 1918. She won a scholarship to attend the Pratt Institute and study art. After two years at Pratt, White continued her training at the Albright Art Gallery in Buffalo. In 1920, she married David Blair Jones and continued her studies in Woodstock with Cecil Chichester; with Henry Hensche in Provincetown, Massachusetts; Wayman Adams at Elizabethtown, New York; and Anthony di Bona at Saranac Lake. In 1930, Jones was awarded a fellowship from the Buffalo Society of Arts and she and David moved to Saranac Lake, where David was a tubercular patient in a nursing cottage. The following year, the couple had a daughter, Lucy. Jones opened a studio on the grounds of the Trudeau Institute.

== Career ==
Jones began submitting sketches for art competitions as part of the New Deal's Treasury Relief Art Project during the Great Depression. In 1937, she submitted a triptych, St. Regis Reservation, for one of the Treasury Department's completions and on the basis of the entry was awarded the contract for the post office of Winsted, Connecticut. The painting is now part of the collection at the Adirondack Museum in Blue Mountain Lake, New York. It pictures daily life and work on the St. Regis Mohawk Reservation, including logging, basket weaving, and health care.

The Winsted post office mural was Jones's first commission. Her 1938 painting, Lincoln's Arbiter Settles the Winsted Post Office Controversy depicted a historical conflict in Winsted over where the post office for the town was to be located. Warring factions wanted it placed in the east or west sides of town, and sent countless protests to Washington, forcing President Lincoln to send an envoy to settle the dispute. That same year, she had her first international exposure and began a long career of exhibiting both in the U.S. and abroad. Her watercolor Apple Tree was selected as part of the 1938 international exhibition of the Art Institute of Chicago.

In 1939, Jones was awarded the mural contract for the Painted Post, New York, post office. Her painting, Recording the Victory, shows a group of Revolutionary soldiers who have been captured by a group of Native Americans. That same year, her watercolor, Saranac River was invited for the Art Institute of Chicago's show and a 1940 oil painting When Work is Done was included in an exhibit at the Smithsonian. Some of her works from this period were also reproduced in Life and the Art Digest. Jones taught art classes at Saranac Lake and served on the board of the local craft board and the village art league. In 1941, she painted The Glen Family Spared by French and Indians for the post office in Scotia, New York. In 1943, Jones left Saranac Lake and moved to Mount Kisco, which would remain her home base for nearly forty years. Jones continued painting and exhibiting in both the U.S. and abroad, traveling to several cities in Italy, as well as holding one-woman shows in London and Paris.

In addition to fine art, Jones was a noted illustrator and commercial artist. She designed a poster for the Lake Placid Club, probably as part of the club's campaign to bring the Olympics to Lake Placid in 1932. She had works selected for the 1946 edition of Robert Louis Stevenson's A child's garden of verses. Jones' first husband died in 1955 and the following year, she was the only female artist profiled in Norman Kent's book Seascapes and Landscapes in Watercolor. In 1961, she married Owen Phelps Frisbie, of Long Island, New York. In the Vietnam Era, Jones completed works for the United States Army Art Program depicting medical services provided by the military. In WAF Surgical Technician—Orlando (1965), a woman, who is a hospital technician at the Orlando Air Force Base, is making medication rounds with a male orderly. Throughout the 1970s, Jones worked and exhibited at such venues as the Hudson River Museum (1972) in Yonkers, New York; the Galeria Santo Stefano (1972) in Venice; the Gallerida II Sigillo (1974) of Padua, Italy; the Gallery of Glory Be (1975) in Kingston, Jamaica; and the Wave Hill Gallery (1977) in Riverdale, New York, among others.

In 1986, Jones moved to Escondido, California, to be near her daughter. She continued to work and hold exhibitions. Jones died on October 8, 1992, in Escondido, California.

== Legacy ==
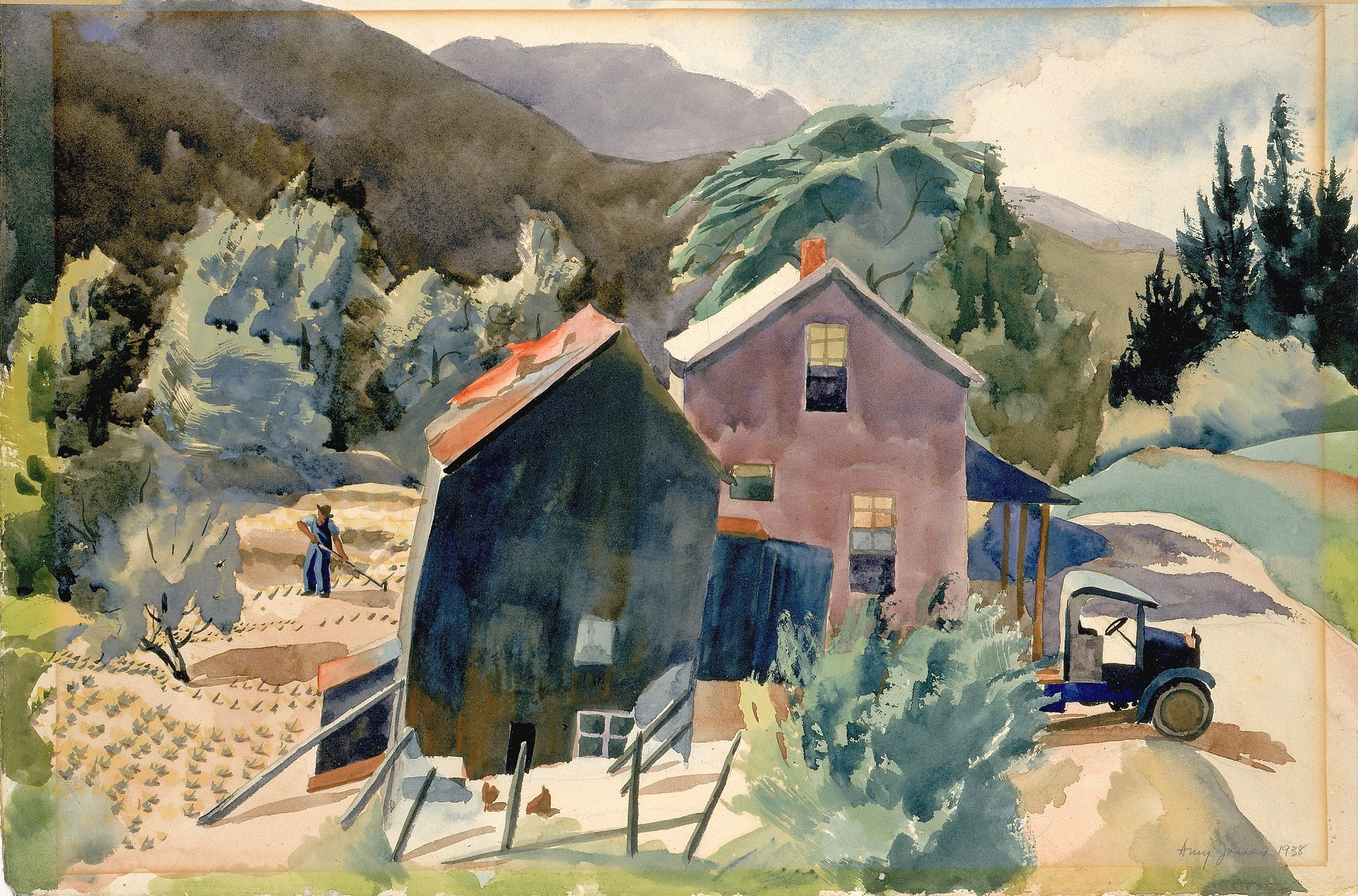
Sandy Acre (1938)

Jones' painting Sandy Acre is in the permanent collection of the Smithsonian American Art Museum. Both the Ford Motor Company and Standard Oil Company have sizable collections of her works and the New York Hospital has 35 of her paintings in their collection. Besides public and private corporate holdings, Jones has works in numerous private collections and museums.
