= Painted Post, New York =

Painted Post
- Village
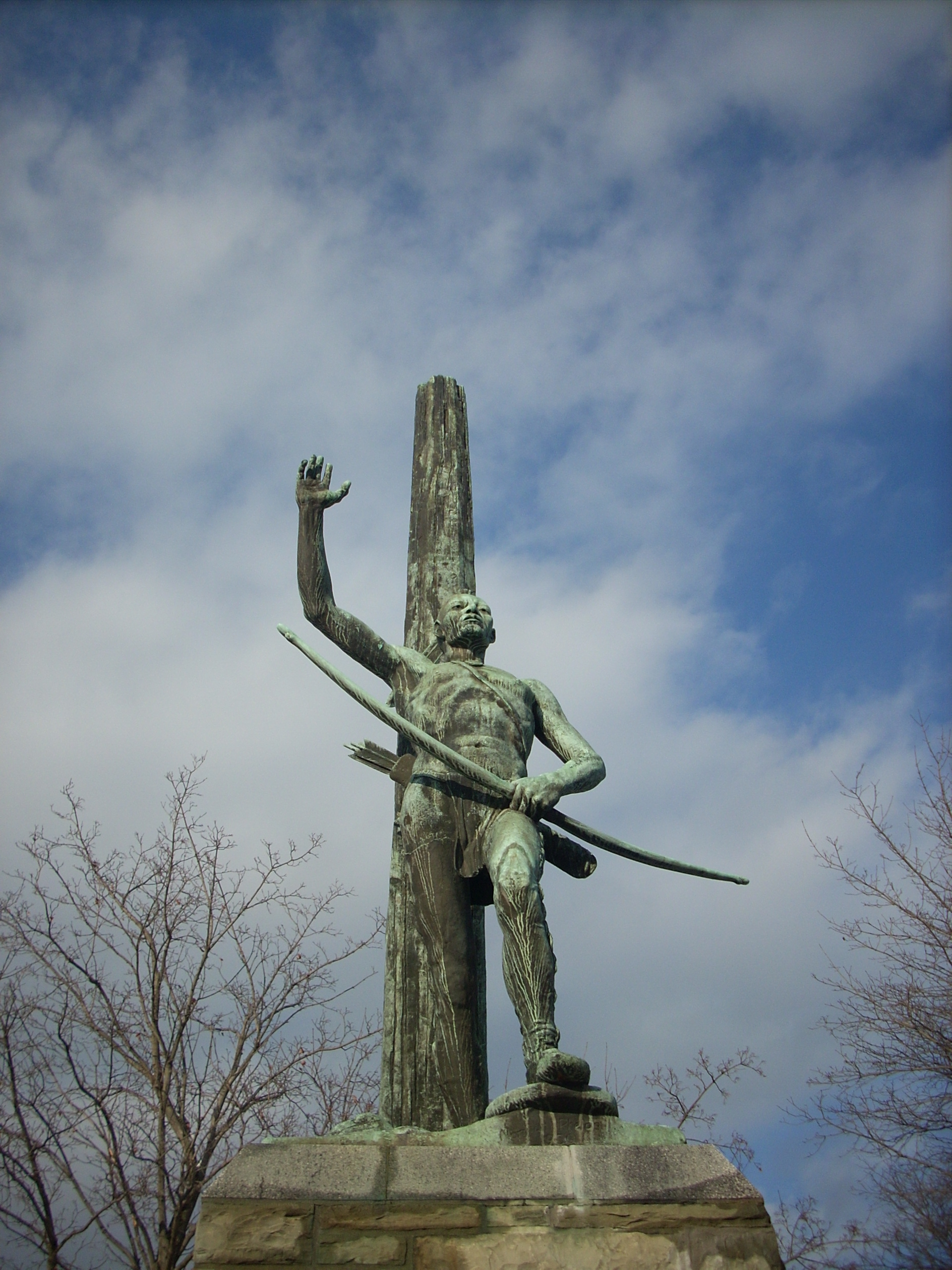
- A monument to the Seneca Indians in Painted Post

- Location within the state of New York
- Coordinates: 42°9′40″N 77°5′29″W
- Country: United States
- State: New York
- County: Steuben

Area
  - Total: 1.34 sq mi (3.46 km^{2})
  - Land: 1.27 sq mi (3.30 km^{2})
  - Water: 0.062 sq mi (0.16 km^{2})
- Elevation: 942 ft (287 m)

Population (2020)
  - Total: 1,768
  - Density: 1,387.6/sq mi (535.75/km^{2})
- Time zone: UTC-5 (Eastern (EST))
  - Summer (DST): UTC-4 (EDT)
- ZIP Code: 14870
- Area code: 607
- FIPS code: 36-56088
- GNIS feature ID: 0959764
- Website: http://villageofpaintedpost.com/

Painted Post is a village in Steuben County, New York. The village is in the town of Erwin, west of the city of Corning. As of the 2020 census, Painted Post had a population of 1,768. The name comes from a Seneca carved post found by explorers at the junction of three local rivers. Corning-Painted Post Airport (7N1) is west of the village.

The former town of Painted Post was in 1836 renamed the town of Corning.

== History ==
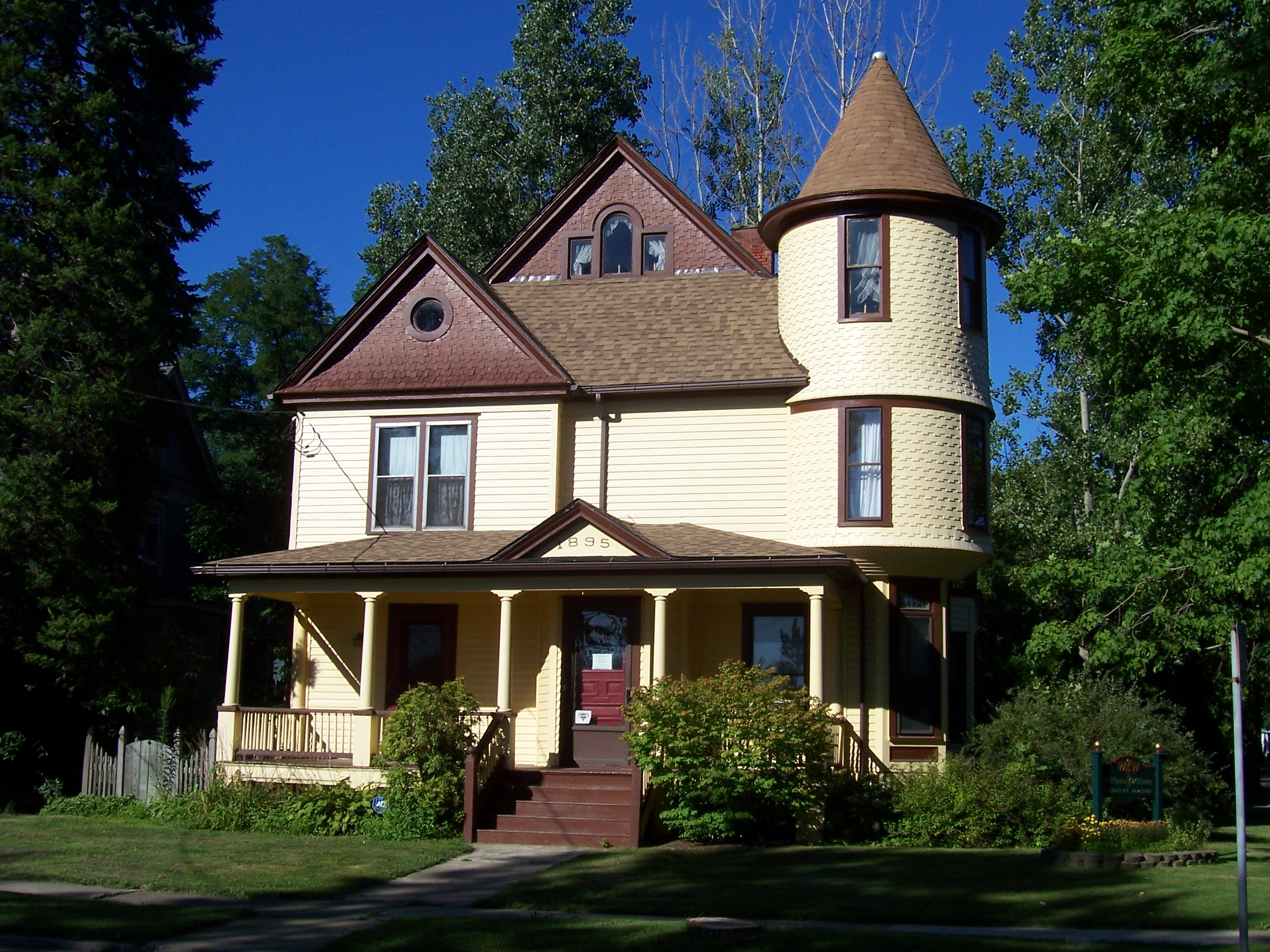
Victorian-era house on the corner of Water and Charles streets in Painted Post

The Senecas never had a painted post but rather the post that existed in the Painted Post area was not "painted". The plain post had been used as a type of bulletin board and when the white settlers moved into the area they painted it. To paint this post was desecration to the Seneca people. The Seneca language word for the area was TKäen DōD, meaning "land of the post".

According to village records, Painted Post was established as a village in 1803. The Erwin brothers are considered the first wealthy European descended settlers to have settled in the Painted Post area in the late 18th century (Painted Post village is in the town of Erwin, named for the brothers and incorporated in 1796). The brothers' 4 mansions are still standing. There are maps in existence dated 1796 which include Painted Post. The village was first incorporated in 1860 and officially re-incorporated in 1893. The name is derived from a historic, although probably unpainted, wooden post seen in the area at the end of the 18th century. The origin and purpose of the post remain controversial. A glyph of the post is visible on the aforementioned 1796 map.

The following footnote appears in French's Gazetteer of New York State and gives two possible versions of the origin of the name:

In the summer of 1779, a party of tories and Indians, under the command of a loyalist named McDonald, returned from an incursion into the Susquehanna settlements, bringing with them many of their number wounded. At the confluence of Tioga and Conhocton [sic] Rivers, Captain Montour, son of the famous Queen Catharine, a Seneca chief of great promise, died of his wounds. "His comrades buried him by the riverside, and planted above his grave a post on which were painted various symbols and rude devices. This monument was known throughout the Genesee Forests as 'The Painted Post.' It was a landmark well known to all the Six Nations, and was often visited by their braves and chieftains." This account of the origin of the Painted Post was given to Benj. Patterson, the hunter, by a man named Taggart, who was carried to Fort Niagara a prisoner by McDonald's party, end was a witness of the burial of Capt. Montour, or at least was in the encampment at the mouth of the Tioga at the time of his death. Col. Harper, of Harpersfield, the well known officer of the frontier militia of New York in the Revolution, informed Judge Knox, of Knoxville, in this co., that the Painted Post was erected over the grave of a chief who was wounded at the battle of the "Hog-Back" and brought in a canoe to the head of the Chemung, where he died. It was well understood by the early settlers that this monument was erected in memory of some distinguished warrior who had been wounded in one of the border battles of the Revolution and afterward died at this place. The post stood for many years after the settlement of the co.; and the story goes that it rotted down at the butt, and was preserved in the bar-room of a tavern till about the year 1810 and then mysteriously disappeared. It is also said to have been swept away in a freshet. — McMasters's Hist, of Steuben. Simm's Hist, Schoharie, p. 333.

In June 1972 the remnants of Hurricane Agnes stalled over the New York–Pennsylvania border, dropping up to 20 inches (500 mm) of rain into the Chemung Valley, which was among the worst hit areas by the resultant flooding. The Chemung, Tioga, and Cohocton rivers all overflowed their banks, leaving widespread areas of Painted Post as well as Corning, Big Flats, and Elmira under water and destroying many bridges.

Painted Post is featured in the Stephen Vincent Benét poem "American Names".

The First Baptist Church of Painted Post, Delaware, Lackawanna & Western Railroad Station, and United States Post Office are listed on the National Register of Historic Places. The Painted Post post office contains a mural, Recording the Victory, painted by muralist Amy Jones in 1939. Federally-commissioned murals were produced from 1934 to 1943 in the United States through the Section of Painting and Sculpture, later called the Section of Fine Arts, of the Treasury Department.

== Geography ==
According to the United States Census Bureau, the village has a total area of 1.3 square miles (3.4 km^{2}), of which 1.3 square miles (3.4 km^{2}) is land and .1 square miles (0.26 km^{2}) (4.51%) is water.

New York State Route 415 passes through the village, which also borders the Southern Tier Expressway and the Cohocton River.

Interstate 86 also passes through Painted Post, and continues on until Jamestown.

== Demographics ==
Historical population
Census	Pop.	Note	%±
1880	701		—
1890	688		−1.9%
1900	775		12.6%
1910	1,224		57.9%
1920	2,170		77.3%
1930	2,328		7.3%
1940	2,337		0.4%
1950	2,405		2.9%
1960	2,570		6.9%
1970	2,496		−2.9%
1980	2,196		−12.0%
1990	1,950		−11.2%
2000	1,842		−5.5%
2010	1,809		−1.8%
2020	1,768		−2.3%
U.S. Decennial Census

As of the census of 2000, there were 1,842 people, 811 households, and 480 families residing in the village. The population density was 1,457.0 inhabitants per square mile (562.6/km^{2}). There were 879 housing units at an average density of 695.3 per square mile (268.5/km^{2}). The racial makeup of the village was 95.71% White, 1.36% African American, 0.16% Native American, 1.74% Asian, 0.11% from other races, and 0.92% from two or more races. Hispanic or Latino of any race were 0.76% of the population.

There were 811 households, out of which 27.6% had children under the age of 18 living with them, 46.2% were married couples living together, 9.4% had a female householder with no husband present, and 40.8% were non-families. 36.5% of all households were made up of individuals, and 23.8% had someone living alone who was 65 years of age or older. The average household size was 2.26 and the average family size was 2.97.

In the village, the population was spread out, with 23.9% under the age of 18, 5.6% from 18 to 24, 25.7% from 25 to 44, 23.1% from 45 to 64, and 21.7% who were 65 years of age or older. The median age was 42 years. For every 100 females, there were 84.6 males. For every 100 females age 18 and over, there were 78.4 males.

The median income for a household in the village was $41,477, and the median income for a family was $58,295. Males had a median income of $39,519 versus $26,583 for females. The per capita income for the village was $23,664. About 4.5% of families and 5.2% of the population were below the poverty line, including 5.0% of those under age 18 and 5.7% of those age 65 or over.

== Education ==
Public education is administered by the Corning-Painted Post Area School District a.k.a. Corning City School District. Public schools located in Painted Post include Corning-Painted Post Middle School, Calvin U. Smith, Erwin Valley.

== Notable people ==
- W. Sterling Cole, former US congressman
- Willard Nelson Clute, botanist
- Charles B. Farwell, Chicago merchant, banker, and politician
- William Spring Hubbell, former US congressman
- Thomas J. Watson, founder of IBM
