= World War Memorial Library =

- U.S. National Register of Historic Places
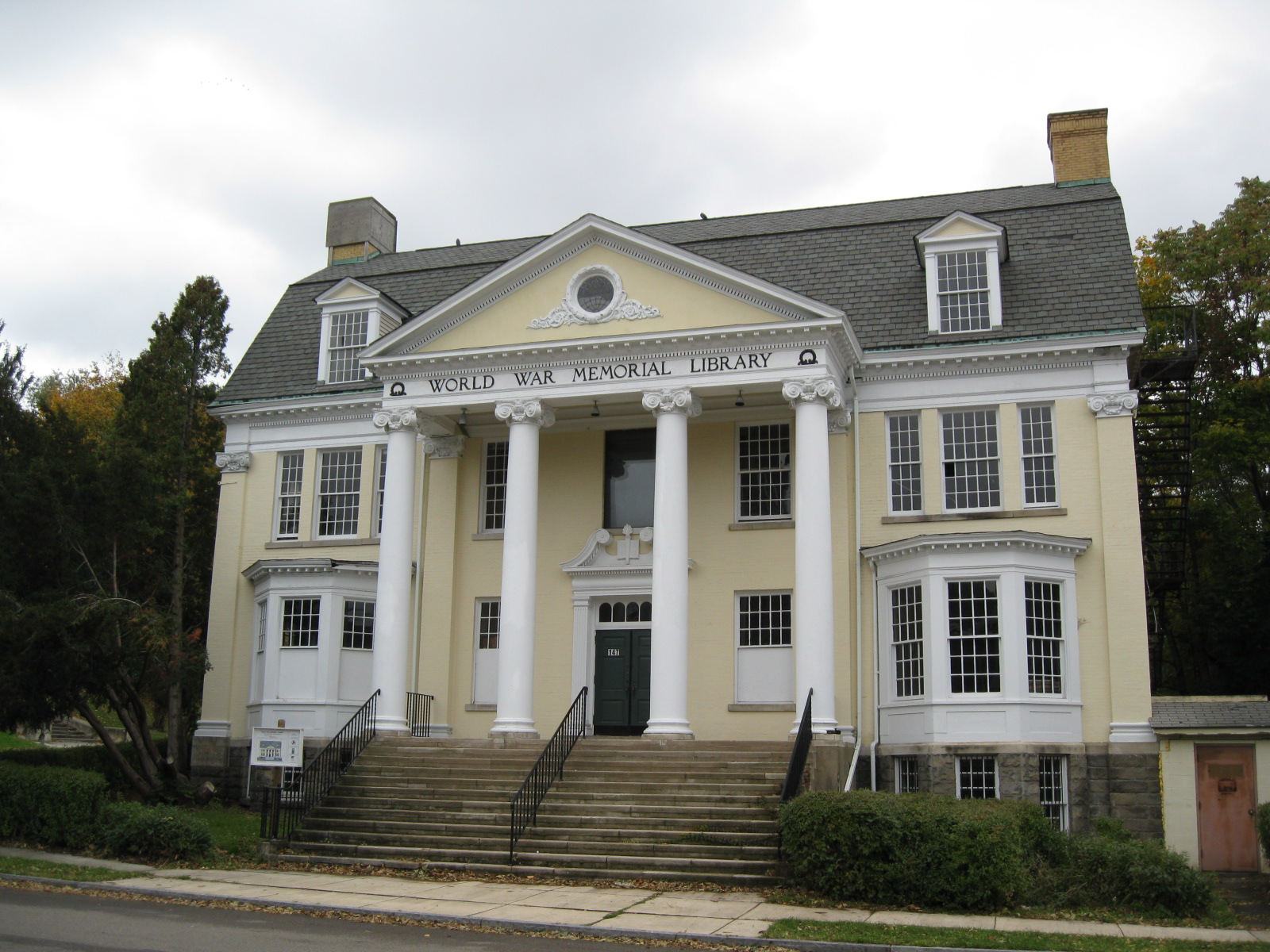
- World War Memorial Library, October 2009

- Location within New York Location within the United States
- Location: 147 Pine St., Corning, New York
- Coordinates: 42°8′30″N 77°3′21″W
- Area: less than one acre
- Built: 1897
- Architect: Pierce & Bickford; Palmer Rogers
- Architectural style: Colonial Revival, Classical Revival
- NRHP reference No.: 95000361
- Added to NRHP: March 31, 1995

World War Memorial Library, also known as Corning City Club, is a historic library building located at Corning in Steuben County, New York. It is a 2 1/2-story brick structure in a combination of the Colonial Revival and Classical Revival styles. Built in 1897 to house the Corning City Club, it became home to the library and memorial to Corning natives who lost their lives in World War I following a fire in 1926. The original architects were Pierce & Bickford of Elmira, with the later remodeling by Palmer Rogers of New York City.

It was listed on the National Register of Historic Places in 1995.
