= Gibson, New York =

- Hamlet
- Location of Gibson in New York
- Coordinates: 42°08′24″N 077°01′51″W
- Country: United States
- State: New York
- County: Steuben
- Town: Corning
- Elevation: 932 ft (284 m)
- Time zone: UTC-5 (Eastern (EST))
  - Summer (DST): UTC-4 (EDT)
- ZIP code: 14830
- Area code: 607
- GNIS feature ID: 951065

Gibson is a hamlet in Eastern Steuben County, New York, United States. The hamlet is located in the town of Corning on the north bank of the Chemung River. Residents of Gibson are served by the Corning Painted Post Area School District.

The combined New York State Route 17 and I-86 run between the river and the hamlet. The former Erie Railroad runs between the highway and the hamlet.
