= Corning (town), New York =

Corning, New York
- Town
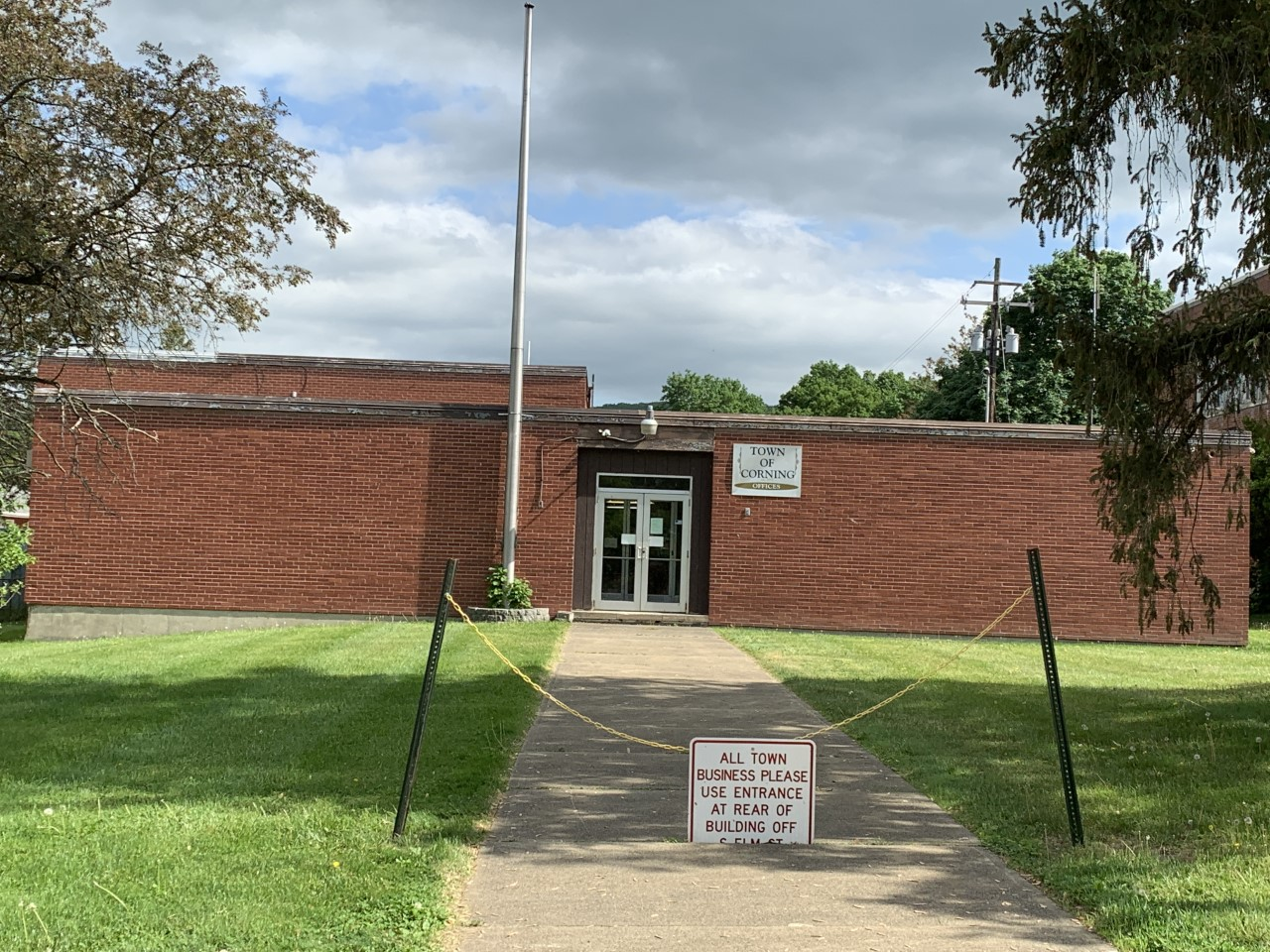
- Town hall

- Location within the state of New York Corning, New York (the United States)
- Coordinates: 42°8′28″N 77°1′57″W
- Country: United States
- State: New York
- County: Steuben

Area
  - Total: 37.35 sq mi (96.74 km^{2})
  - Land: 36.85 sq mi (95.44 km^{2})
  - Water: 0.50 sq mi (1.30 km^{2})
- Elevation: 1,093 ft (333 m)

Population (2020)
  - Total: 5,986 ▼
  - Estimate (2021): 5,920
  - Density: 169.5/sq mi (65.46/km^{2})
- Time zone: UTC-5 (Eastern (EST))
  - Summer (DST): UTC-4 (EDT)
- ZIP codes: 14830-14831
- Area code: 607
- FIPS code: 36-18267
- GNIS feature ID: 0978868
- Website: https://townofcorningny.gov/

Corning is a town in Steuben County, New York, United States. The town is in the eastern part of the county and borders the city of Corning. The town population was 5,986 at the 2020 census. The town is named after Erastus Corning, a financier.

== History ==
The first settlement was near the current city of Corning around 1789. The Town of Corning began as the "Town of Painted Post" in 1796 when the county was founded. In 1836, the name was changed to honor an important investor in the local economy. The community of Corning incorporated as a village in 1848, and separated itself from the town entirely after its incorporation as a city in 1890.

The town of Corning was incorporated in 1852.

== Geography ==
According to the United States Census Bureau, the town has a total area of 37.3 square miles (97 km^{2}), of which 0.4 square miles (1.0 km^{2}) (1.07%) is water.

The Chemung River, formed by the confluence of the Cohocton and Tioga Rivers a few miles west of the town, flows through the town, and the city of Corning.

The east town line is the border of Chemung County, (Town of Big Flats).

Interstate 86, New York State Route 17, New York State Route 225, New York State Route 352, New York State Route 414, and New York State Route 415 pass through the town.

== Demographics ==
Historical population
Census	Pop.	Note	%±
1820	2,088		—
1830	974		−53.4%
1840	1,674		71.9%
1850	4,372		161.2%
1860	6,003		37.3%
1870	6,502		8.3%
1880	7,402		13.8%
1890	1,638		−77.9%
1900	1,937		18.3%
1910	2,391		23.4%
1920	2,857		19.5%
1930	2,997		4.9%
1940	3,152		5.2%
1950	4,275		35.6%
1960	6,732		57.5%
1970	7,523		11.7%
1980	6,846		−9.0%
1990	6,367		−7.0%
2000	6,426		0.9%
2010	6,270		−2.4%
2020	5,986		−4.5%
2021 (est.)	5,920		−1.1%
U.S. Decennial Census

As of the census of 2000, there were 6,426 people, 2,491 households, and 1,840 families residing in the town. The population density was 174.1 inhabitants per square mile (67.2/km^{2}). There were 2,626 housing units at an average density of 71.1 per square mile (27.5/km^{2}). The racial makeup of the town was 95.25% White, 2.46% Black or African American, 0.20% Native American, 1.35% Asian, 0.11% from other races, and 0.62% from two or more races. Hispanic or Latino of any race were 0.67% of the population.

There were 2,491 households, out of which 32.5% had children under the age of 18 living with them, 59.8% were married couples living together, 9.8% had a female householder with no husband present, and 26.1% were non-families. 21.3% of all households were made up of individuals, and 9.0% had someone living alone who was 65 years of age or older. The average household size was 2.57 and the average family size was 2.96.

In the town, the population was spread out, with 25.4% under the age of 18, 6.8% from 18 to 24, 27.7% from 25 to 44, 25.8% from 45 to 64, and 14.4% who were 65 years of age or older. The median age was 39 years. For every 100 females, there were 97.7 males. For every 100 females age 18 and over, there were 94.2 males.

The median income for a household in the town was $44,649, and the median income for a family was $51,470. Males had a median income of $40,542 versus $25,804 for females. The per capita income for the town was $23,149. About 5.9% of families and 8.2% of the population were below the poverty line, including 10.9% of those under age 18 and 2.8% of those age 65 or over.

== Communities and locations in the Town of Corning ==
- Corning Community College – A public junior college west of South Corning.
- Corning Manor – A hamlet southeast of Corning city by Interstate 86.
- Denmark – A hamlet and suburban community northeast of Corning city.
- East Corning – A location near the east town line on NY-352.
- French Mill – A hamlet south of Corning on NY-225.
- Gibson – A hamlet southeast of Corning city on the north bank of the Chemung River.
- Guthrie Corning Hospital
- Narrows Creek – A stream entering the Chemung River by Gibson.
- Post Creek – A stream entering the Chemung River by Corning city.
- Riverside – A village located on NY-415 that borders the city of Corning on its west side.
- South Corning – A village located on NY-225 south of the city of Corning.

== Notable person ==
- Deacon White, born in Caton, Major League Baseball manager and Hall of Fame player. White was the first batter to come to the plate in the National Association. Lived in Corning for many years during his baseball career.

== See also ==
- Corning, New York
