= Hammondsport Central School District =

School district in New York, United States

Hammondsport Central School

Location
- Hammondsport, New York Finger Lakes United States

District information
- Grades: K-12
- Superintendent: Kyle Bower
- Schools: 1

Students and staff
- Athletic conference: Section V
- District mascot: Lakers
- Colors: Purple and White

Other information
- Director of Athletics: Dan Conley
- Website: http://www.hammondsportcsd.org/

Hammondsport Central School District is a school district in Hammondsport, New York, United States. The superintendent is Mr. Kyle Bower.

== Administration ==
The District offices are located 8272 Main Street. The current Superintendent is Kyle Bower.

=== Board of education ===
- Jim Zimar–President
- Dennis Carlson–Vice President
- Lynda Lowin
- Rick Drain
- Kevin W. Bennett

=== Selected Former Superintendents ===
- Ms. Marilyn J. Dominick–?-2000
- Dr. James J. Giordano–2000-2003
- Dr. Christopher R. Brown–2003-2008

== Secondary school ==
Hammondsport Junior/Senior High School
- 14840

Information
- Principal: Tad R. Rounds
- Grades: 7-12
- Average class size: 30
- Language: English
- Hours in school day: 6
- Mascot: Captain Laker
- Team name: The Lakers
- Yearbook: The Vintage
- Website: Hammondsport Junior/Senior High

Hammondsport Junior/Senior High School is located at 8272 Main Street and serves grades 7 through 12. The current principal is Mr. Tad Rounds. There is also a primary wing in the high school dedicated to k-3 and recently the curtiss school has been moved to the highschool. Now the highschool currently serves grades K-12 with Joe Koehler as elementary principal and Tad Rounds as Jr./Sr. High Principal.

=== History ===
==== Selected former principals ====
Previous assignment and reason for departure denoted in parentheses

- Mr. Daniel Perrine–?-2000
- Mr. James J. Mitchell–2000-2002
- Ms. Julie Sissell–2002-2005
- Mr. Peter Robbins–2005-2006

== Glenn Curtiss Elementary School ==
Hammondsport Elementary School is located at 15 Bauder Street and is now being sold. Originally known as 'Hammondsport High School, Glenn H. Curtiss Memorial,' the school building most recently served grades 4-6. The students were moved to the main street school when the school was closed due to declining enrollment following the 2010 academic school year. The school was designed in the Art Deco style by noted New York architect Graham O'Donnell and constructed in 1935.

=== History ===
John Wright Jr. Founded the school in 1869

==== Selected former principals ====
- Ms. Patricia Kent–?-2002
- Mr. Kyle Bower–2002-2008

== See also ==
- Hammondsport Union Free School
