= Mercury Chic T-2 =

Chic T-2
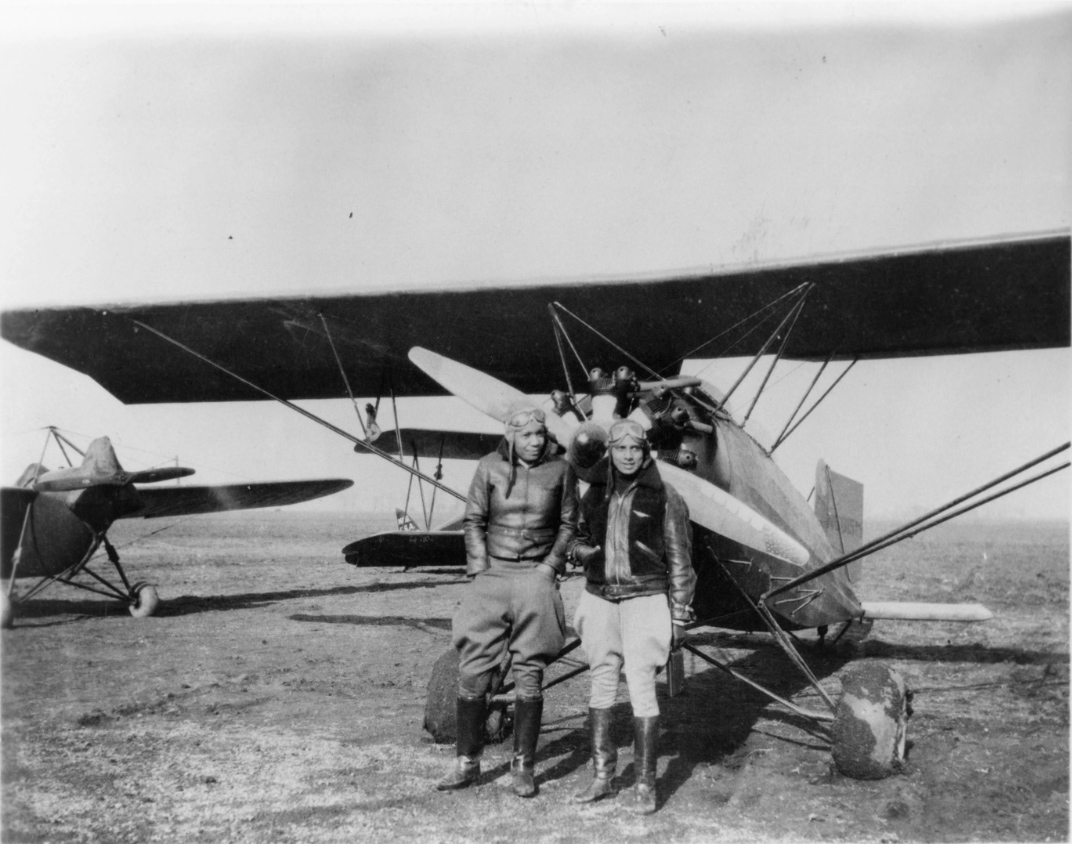
- Lola Albright and Willa Brown at Harlem Airport, Chicago IL, USA, in 1938

General information
- Type: Training monoplane
- National origin: United States
- Manufacturer: Mercury Aircraft
- Number built: 27

History
- First flight: 1928

The Mercury Chic T-2 was a lightweight American parasol wing monoplane designed and built by the Mercury Aircraft Inc. in the late 1920s. Flown for the first time in 1928, about 27 were built, but due to the early 1930s economic depression only 15 were sold, and the rest were scrapped.

== Design ==
The Chic T-2 had a fabric-covered welded-steel tube fuselage with a parasol wing. It had a fixed conventional landing gear and two tandem open cockpits for the pilot and pupil. Originally flown with a 65 hp (48 kW) Viele radial engine, this was soon replaced with a more powerful 90 hp (67 kW) LeBlond 7D radial engine.

== Surviving aircraft ==
A Mercury Chic T-2 (NC53N) is on display at the Glenn H. Curtiss Museum in Hammondsport, New York.

== Specifications ==
Data from Aero Digest March 1937

General characteristics

- Crew: one
- Capacity: one passenger
- Length: 23 ft (7.0 m)
- Wingspan: 35 ft 8 in (10.87 m)
- Height: 8 ft 7 in (2.62 m)
- Wing area: 192 sq ft (17.8 m^{2})
- Empty weight: 935 lb (424 kg)
- Gross weight: 1,513 lb (686 kg)
- Fuel capacity: 28 US gal (23 imp gal; 110 L)
- Powerplant: 1 × LeBlond 7D seven cylinder radial, 90 hp (67 kW)
- Propellers: 2-bladed wooden Hartzell

Performance

- Maximum speed: 115 mph (185 km/h, 100 kn)
- Cruise speed: 95 mph (153 km/h, 83 kn)
- Range: 375 mi (604 km, 326 nmi)
- Service ceiling: 18,000 ft (5,500 m)
- Rate of climb: 900 ft/min (4.6 m/s)
- Landing speed: 40 mph (64 km/h; 35 kn)
