= Mallory Mill =

- U.S. National Register of Historic Places
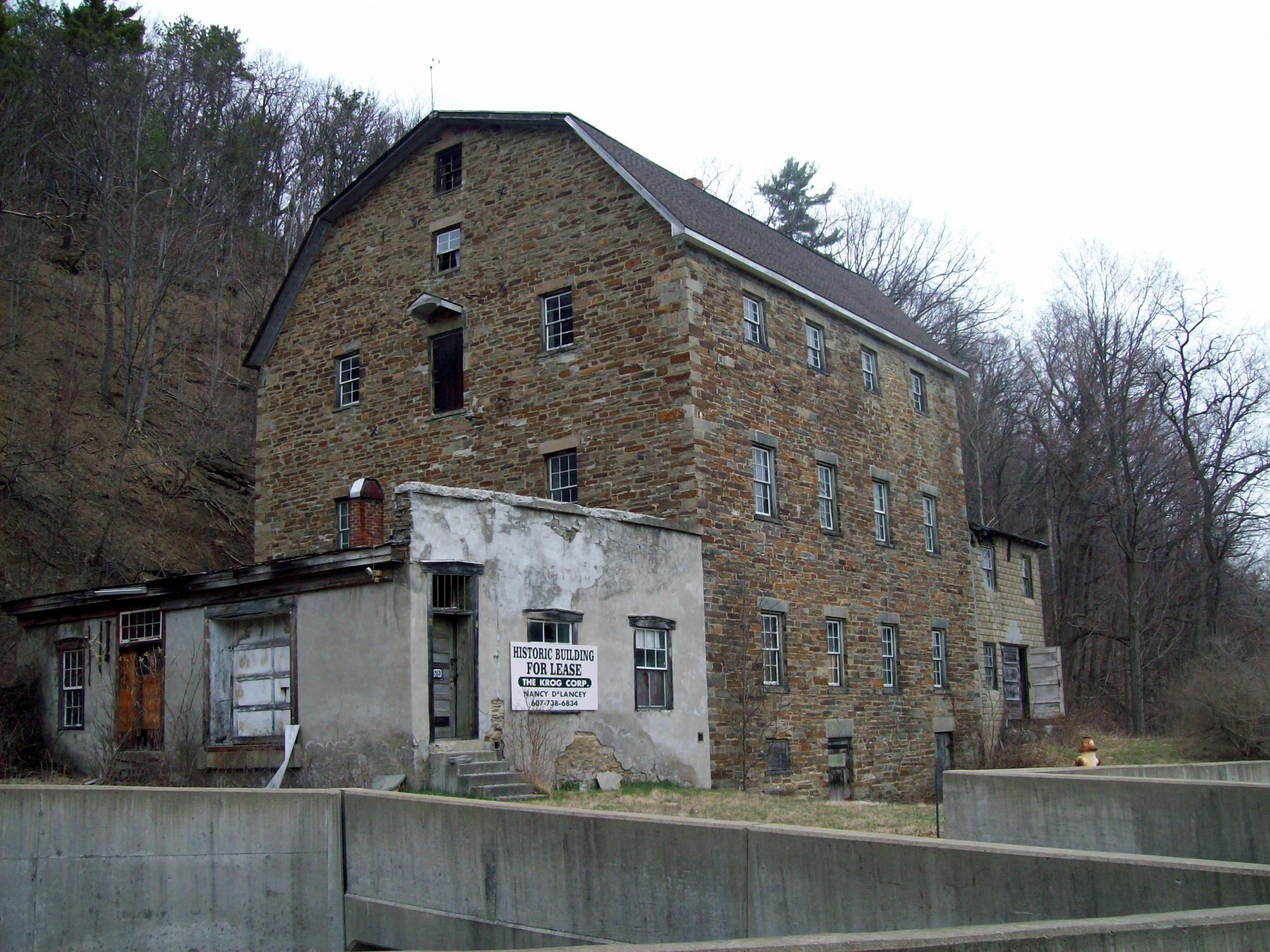
- Mallory Mill, April 2011

- Location within New York Location within the United States
- Location: Pulteney St., Hammondsport, New York
- Coordinates: 42°24′39″N 77°13′36″W
- Area: 13.5 acres (5.5 ha)
- Built: 1836
- Architect: Cappell, John
- NRHP reference No.: 99001545
- Added to NRHP: December 9, 1999

Mallory Mill is a historic grist mill located at Hammondsport in Steuben County, New York. It was built about 1836 and is four story, gambrel roofed stone industrial building. In the 1880s, it was converted for use as a winery.

It was listed on the National Register of Historic Places in 1999.
