= Pulteney Square Historic District =

Historic district in New York, United States

- U.S. National Register of Historic Places
- U.S. Historic district
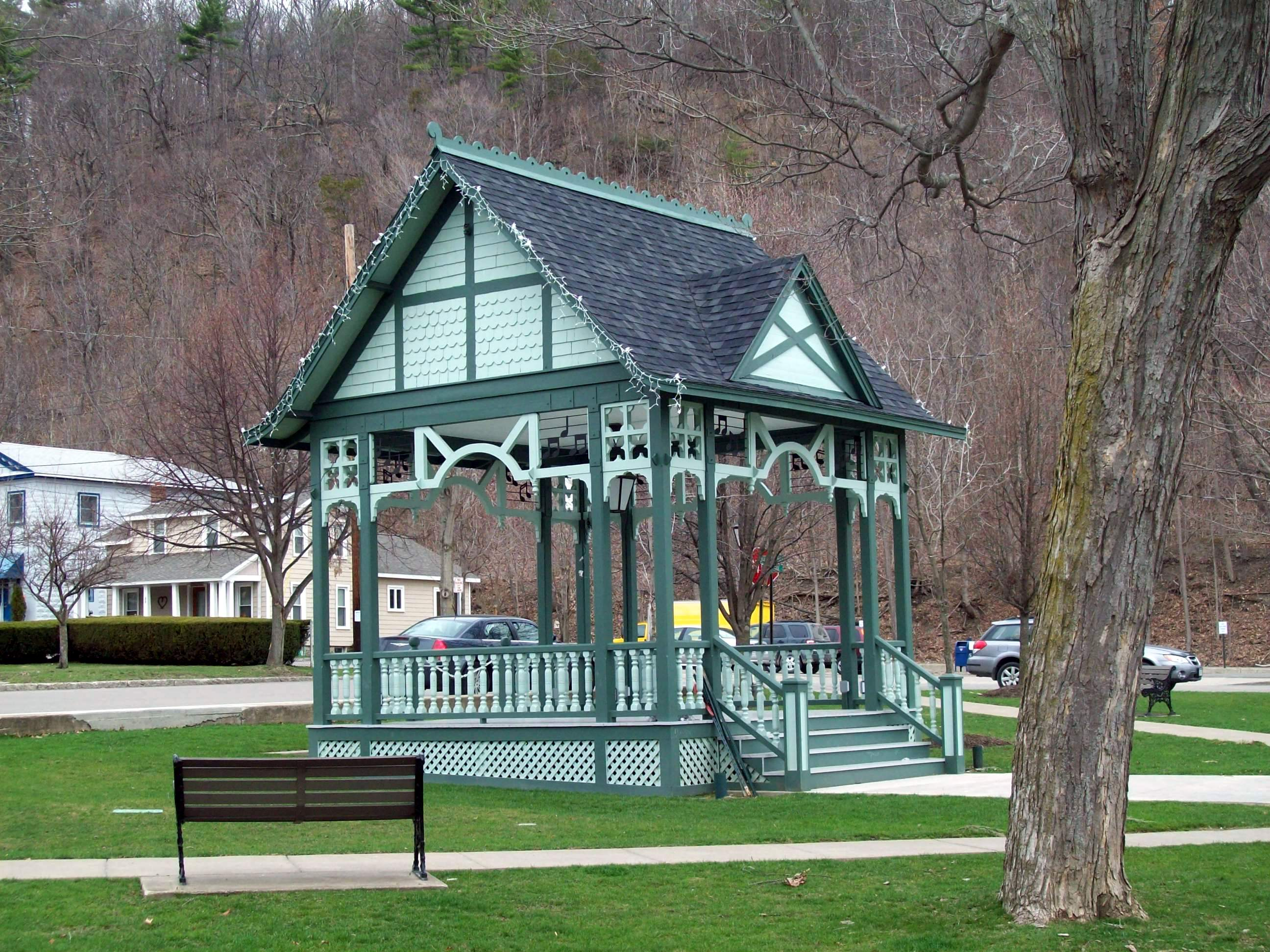
- Pulteney Square Bandstand, April 2011

- Location within New York Location within the United States
- Location: Roughly surrounds Pulteney Sq., Hammondsport, New York
- Coordinates: 42°24′34″N 77°13′22″W
- Area: 0 acres (0 ha)
- Architectural style: Greek Revival, Stick/Eastlake
- NRHP reference No.: 99001364
- Added to NRHP: November 18, 1999

Pulteney Square Historic District is a national historic district located at Hammondsport in Steuben County, New York. The district includes 15 contributing buildings, one contributing structure (bandstand), one contributing site (village green), and three contributing secondary buildings. The structures are clustered around Pulteney Square, a village green roughly 140 feet square, and date from the 1820s to 1920s.

It was listed on the National Register of Historic Places in 1999.

== Gallery ==
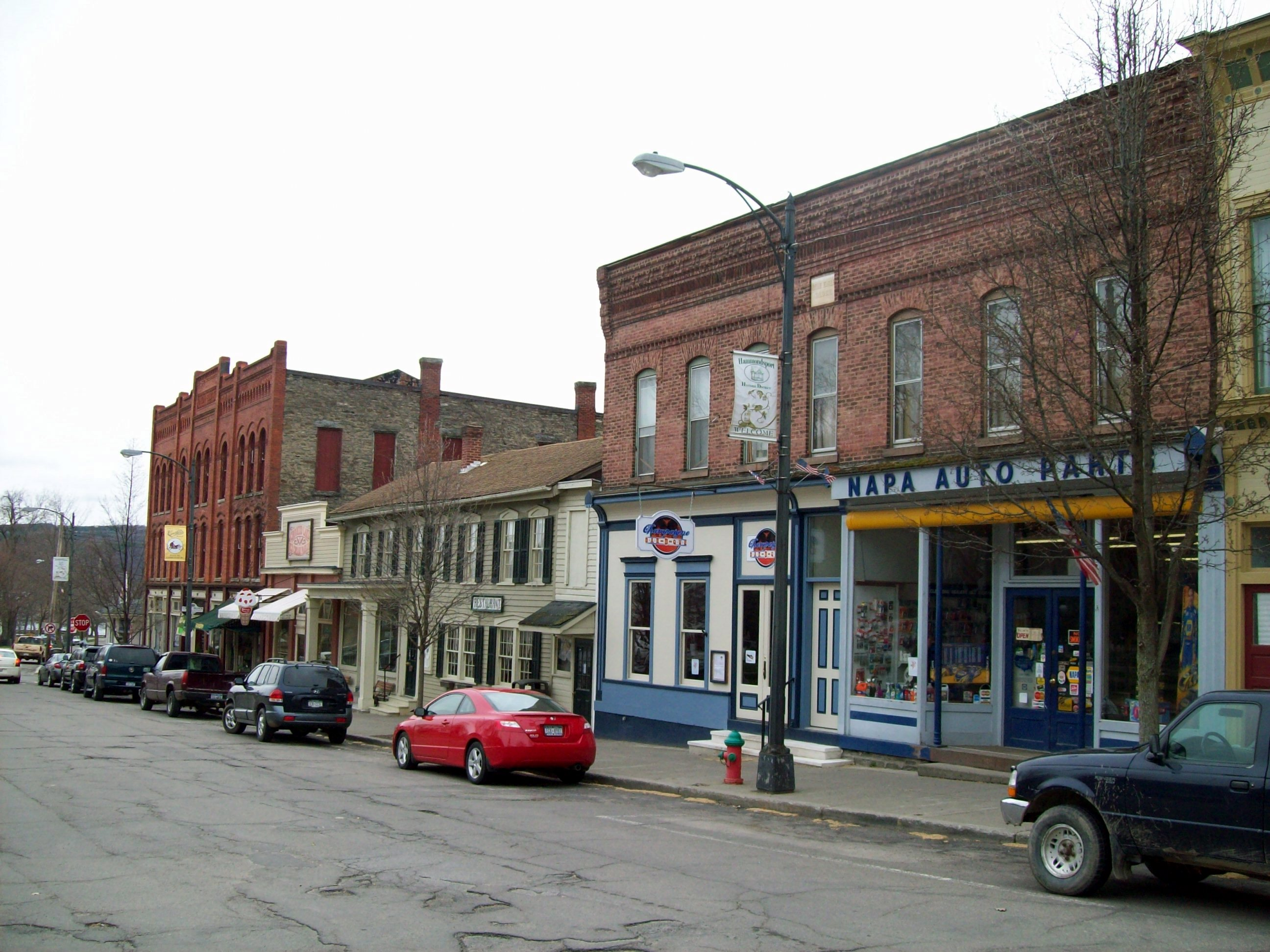
Pulteney Square Historic District, April 2011
