= Mercury Kitten =

American cabin monoplane designed by Mercury Aircraft

Kitten

General information
- Type: Cabin monoplane
- National origin: United States
- Manufacturer: Mercury Aircraft
- Status: Scrapped
- Number built: 1

History
- First flight: 1928

The Mercury Kitten (also known as the Aerial Kitten) was an American three-seat cabin monoplane designed and built by Mercury Aircraft Inc. in the late 1920s. Flown for the first time in 1928 only one was built.

== Design ==
The Kitten was a three-seat high wing cabin monoplane powered by a 60 hp (45 kW) Mummert piston engine. It was constructed with welded steel tubing with fabric covering. It was later re-engined with a 90 hp (67 kW) Warner Scarab engine. The Kitten was scrapped in 1946.
