= Hammondsport Union Free School =

- U.S. National Register of Historic Places
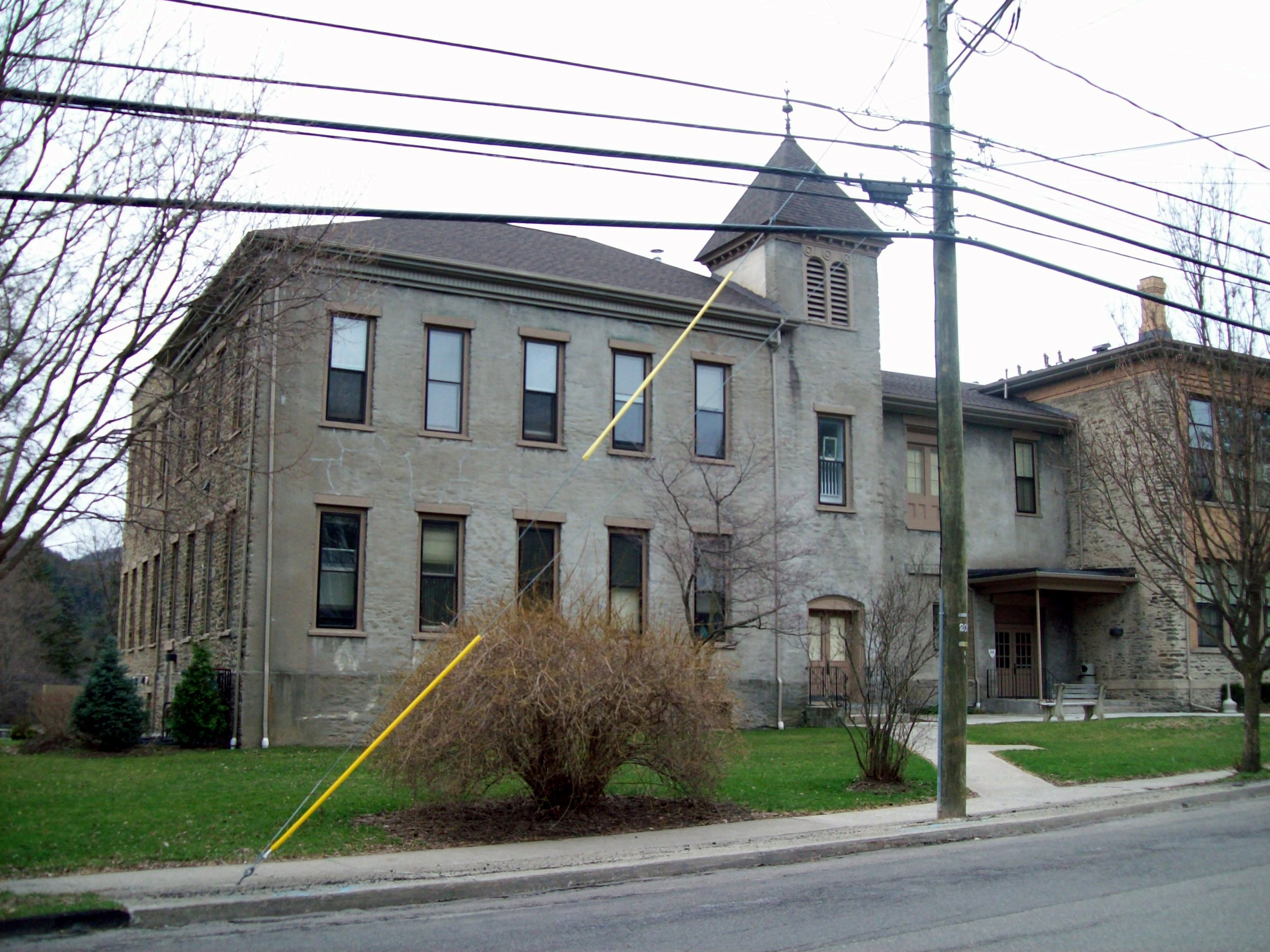
- Hammondsport Union Free School, April 2011

- Location within New York Location within the United States
- Location: 41 Lake St., Hammondsport, New York
- Coordinates: 42°24′28″N 77°13′24″W
- Area: 1.4 acres (0.57 ha)
- Built: 1858
- Architect: Warner, A.J.; et al.
- Architectural style: Italianate, Early Commercial
- NRHP reference No.: 08000411
- Added to NRHP: May 15, 2008

Hammondsport Union Free School, also known as Hammondsport Academy and Hammondsport High School, is a historic school building located at Hammondsport in Steuben County, New York. It is a three-story stone structure in the Italianate style. The earliest section was built in 1858 as a private secondary school, Hammondsport Academy. It was converted to a public union school in 1875, and was expanded in three additions over the next 38 years (1891, 1898, and 1913). It served as a school until 1935 and has been used for other public functions, including as the original home of the Glenn H. Curtiss Museum from 1962 to 1994, and for many years as the Hammondsport Public Library and municipal offices.

It was listed on the National Register of Historic Places in 2008. It was converted to apartments by Arbor Housing and Development, a non-profit group in Bath, NY.

== See also ==
- Hammondsport Central School District
