= Joseph M. Champlin =

Catholic priest and author (1930-2008)

Msgr. Joseph M. Champlin (May 11, 1930 – January 17, 2008) was a Roman Catholic priest, author, and lecturer.

== Life ==
Champlin was born on May 11, 1930, in Hammondsport, New York, the son of Francis Malburn and Katherine Masson Champlin and stepson of Charles Haynes. He was educated in his hometown public schools before graduating from Phillips Academy at Andover, Massachusetts. After studying at Yale and Notre Dame Universities, he entered Saint Bernard's Seminary in Rochester, New York. He was ordained Thursday, February 2, 1956, and enjoyed a full and varied priestly ministry for over 50 years.

Champlin's first assignment was the Cathedral of the Immaculate Conception in Syracuse, New York. He subsequently served as pastor at Holy Family in Fulton, New York and St. Joseph in Camillus, New York, and returned to the Cathedral where he retired after serving as Rector from 1995 to 2005. At the time of his death, he was the sacramental priest at Our Lady of Good Counsel in Warners, New York, and later in the Our Lady of Pompei school (Syracuse New York). In addition to his pastoral ministry, Champlin served as the Diocesan Director of Parish Life and Worship, and associate director in the Liturgy Secretariat for the National Conference of Catholic Bishops in Washington, DC. Champlin was an enthusiastic supporter of the institution of the ministry of Extraordinary Minister of Holy Communion.

As an author, he wrote 50 books with more than 20 million copies of his publications in print. For many years, he authored a weekly column on liturgy and worship, appeared in videos, and made television appearances. He also frequented local radio with inspirational insights. He frequently concluded his appearance with: “You may have tried everything else, why not try God?”

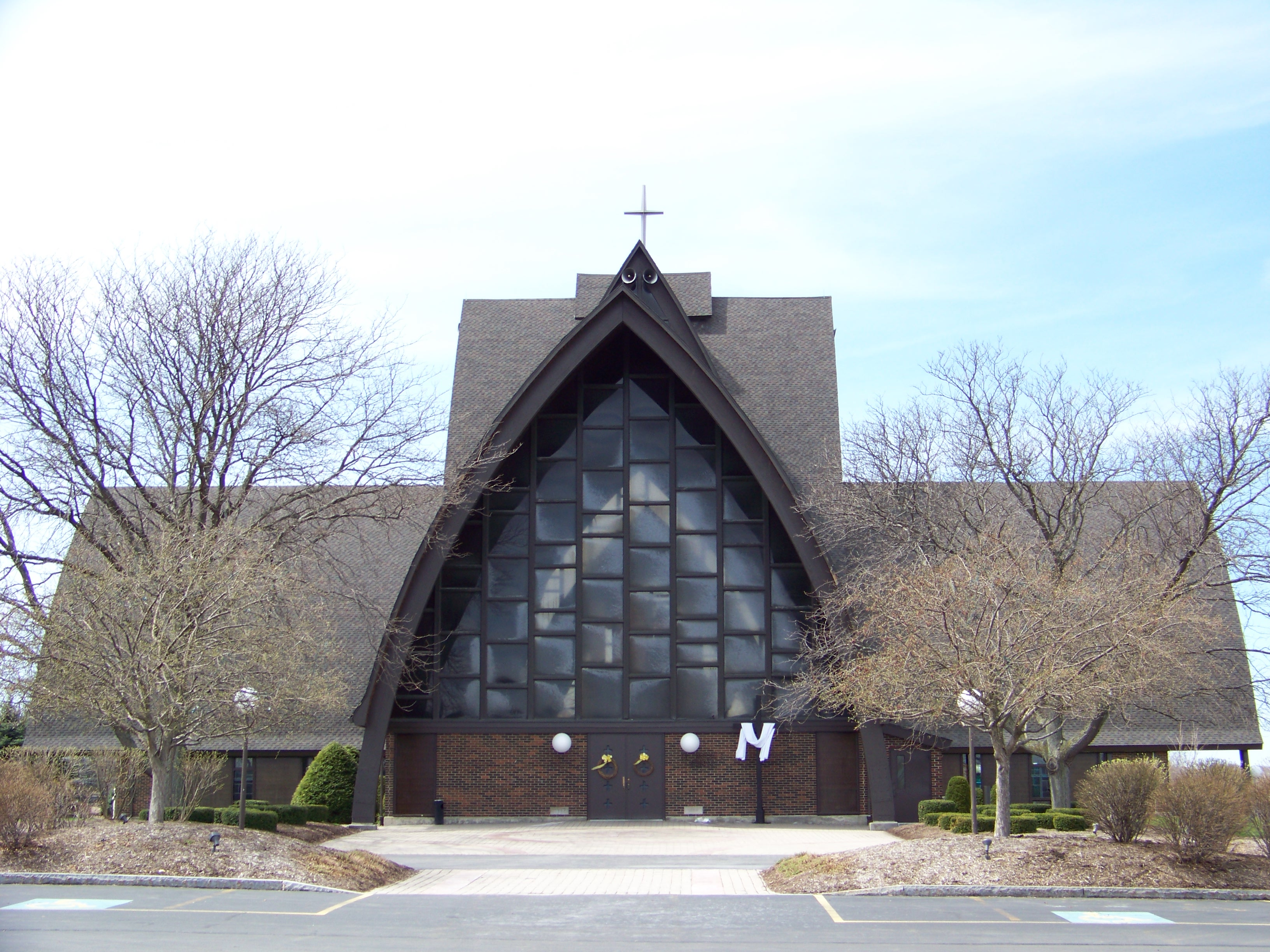
St. Joseph's Church from east parking lot

He spent a year at the North American College in Rome, Italy.

In 1997, Champlin founded the Guardian Angel Society, a non-profit domestic trust effort to provide tuition assistance to children from economically challenged homes. The Society has raised close to $2 million and as of 2019 helped 300 youngsters reach their academic potential and have a better chance at life.

Champlin traveled more than two million miles in and outside the United States, lecturing on liturgical and pastoral matters as well as conducting retreats for priests and parish missions.

== Death ==
Champlin died January 17, 2008, at age 77 from a rare form of cancer. Having been diagnosed with Waldenstrom's, a bone marrow disease, in 2002, his health had been slowly deteriorating. Champlin had arranged to donate his body to Upstate Medical Center to help others through medical research to find cures for disease. Upon return of Champlin's cremains from Upstate Medical Center, they were interred on March 19, 2009, in the crypt of the Syracuse Cathedral.

== Selected writings (mostly paperback) ==
- Together for Life: A Preparation for Marriage Outside Mass (1970, 1979, 1985, 1997)
- Together For Life: A Preparation for Marriage and for the Ceremony (1981, 1986, 1988)
- Inside a Catholic church: A Guide to Signs, Symbols, and Saints (2003)
- Marriage And Holy Orders: Your Call to Love And Serve (with Michael Amodei; 2007)
- Slow Down: Five-Minute Meditations to De-Stress Your Days (2004)
- Communion of the Sick (2005)
- What It Means to Be Catholic (2006)
- "Don't You Really Love Me?" (1968, 1969, 1970, 1971, 1975)
- The Living Parish – A Believing, Caring, Praying People (1977)
- Juntos Para Toda La Vida: Una Preparacion Para El Matrimonio Y La Ceremonia (1994)
- Daily Reflections for Advent 2007: Prepare Your Heart (2007)
- The Eucharist: A Mystery of Faith (2005)
- When the Dying Speak: How to Listen to and Learn from Those Facing Death (with Ronald Wooten-Green; 2002)
- Through Death to Life (1979, 1984, 1990)
- The Breaking Of The Bread: An Updated Handbook For Extraordinary Ministers Of Holy Communion (2005)
- The Marginal Catholic: Challenge, Don't Crush (1989, 2001)
- Should We Marry? (2001)
- Sustaining and Strengthening Stewardship (with James Kelley; 1995)
- Why Go to Confession: Questions and Answers About Sacramental Reconciliation (1982, 1996)
- Take Five: One Hundred Meditations to De-stress Your Days (2006)
- Grateful Caretakers of God's Many Gifts: A Parish Manual to Foster the Sharing of Time, Talent, and Treasure (Sacrificial Giving Program; 2002)
- Firm But Kind And Gentle: A Practical Handbook for Pastoral Ministry (2007)
- The Stations of the Cross With Pope John Paul II (1994)
- From the Heart: Personalizing Your Wedding Homily With Your Own Hopes and Expectations (1998)
- Good Mom, Bad Mom ("The Other Mother: A Novel")
- A Way of Life: Four Faith-Sharing Sessions about Sacrificial Giving, Stewardship, and Grateful Caretaking (2004)
- Preparing for Eternity: A Catholic Handbook for End-of-Life Concerns (2007)
- El Vía Crucis Con El Papa Juan Pablo II (with Grady Gunter; 1997)
- Behind Closed Doors: Handbook on How to Pray (1984)
- An Important Office of Immense Love: A Handbook for Eucharistic Ministers (1997)
- El Rito Del Matrimonio (1996)
- From Time to Eternity and Back: A Priest's Successful Struggle With Cancer (2004)
- Messengers of God's Word: A Handbook of Lectors (1982)
- Taking a Step: Pack of 100 (Sacrificial Giving Program; 2002)
- Special Signs of Grace: The Sacraments and Sacramentals (1986)
- Nurturing Sacrificial Giving: Practical Steps for Its Renewal & Growth (1988)
- Sharing Treasure, Time, and Talent: A Parish Manual for Sacrificial Giving or Tithing (1982)
- Love and Life (New Vision Series) (1966)
- The Lord Is Present (1973)
- Together by your side: A book for comforting sick and dying
- Grateful Giving (Sacrificial Giving Program; 2002)
- Mass in a World of Change (1975)
- Toward a New Life: Prayers, Psalms and Readings for the Family and a Guide for Planning the Funeral Service (with James McGovern and James E. Flynn; 1971)
- Sharing Gifts: A Spirituality of Time, Talent, and Treasure (1991)
- Alone No Longer (1977)
- Christ Present and Yet to Come: The Priest and God's People at Prayer (1981)
- Through the Catechism With Father Champlin (1996)
- An Important Office of Immense Love: A Handbook for Eucharistic Ministers (1984)
- The Sacraments in a World of Change (1972, 1973, 1975)
- Proper Balance (1981)
- Messengers of God's Word: A Handbook of Lectors (1982)
- An Important Office of Immense Love: A Handbook for Eucharistic Ministers (1980)
- Together in Peace for Children (with B. A. Haggerty; 1976)
- Meeting The Merciful Christ: How to Go to Confession (2005)
- Christ present and yet to come: The priest and God's people at prayer (1971)
- Father Champlin on Contemporary Issues: The Ten Commandments and Today's Catholics (1997)
- A Través Del Catecismo: Una Guía De Preguntas Y Respuetas (1999)
- "Do You Really Love Me?" (1971)
- Building better parish councils (1985)
- Pastoral Care: A Parish Planning Workbook (1998)
- Mystery and Meaning of the Mass (1999)
- To Live in Christ – Eucharist: Growing in Daily Spirituality (Spiritual Formation Program; 2007)
