= Mercury Corporation =

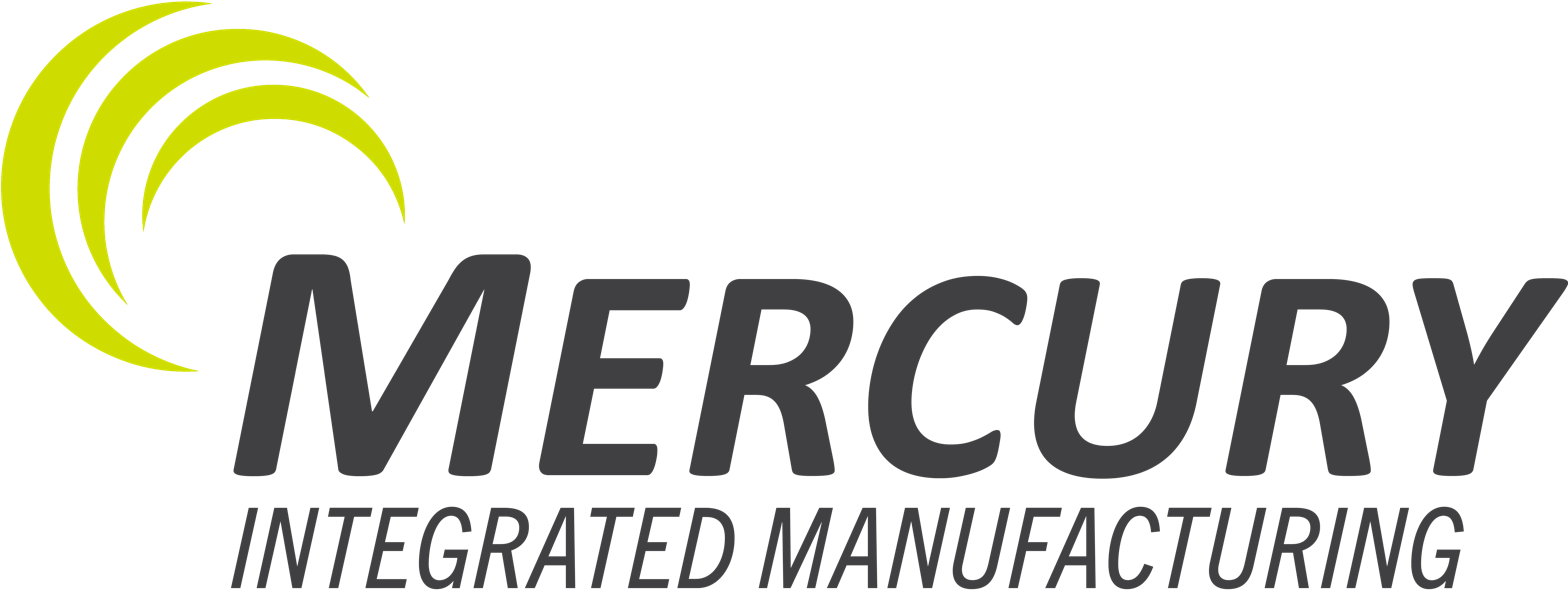

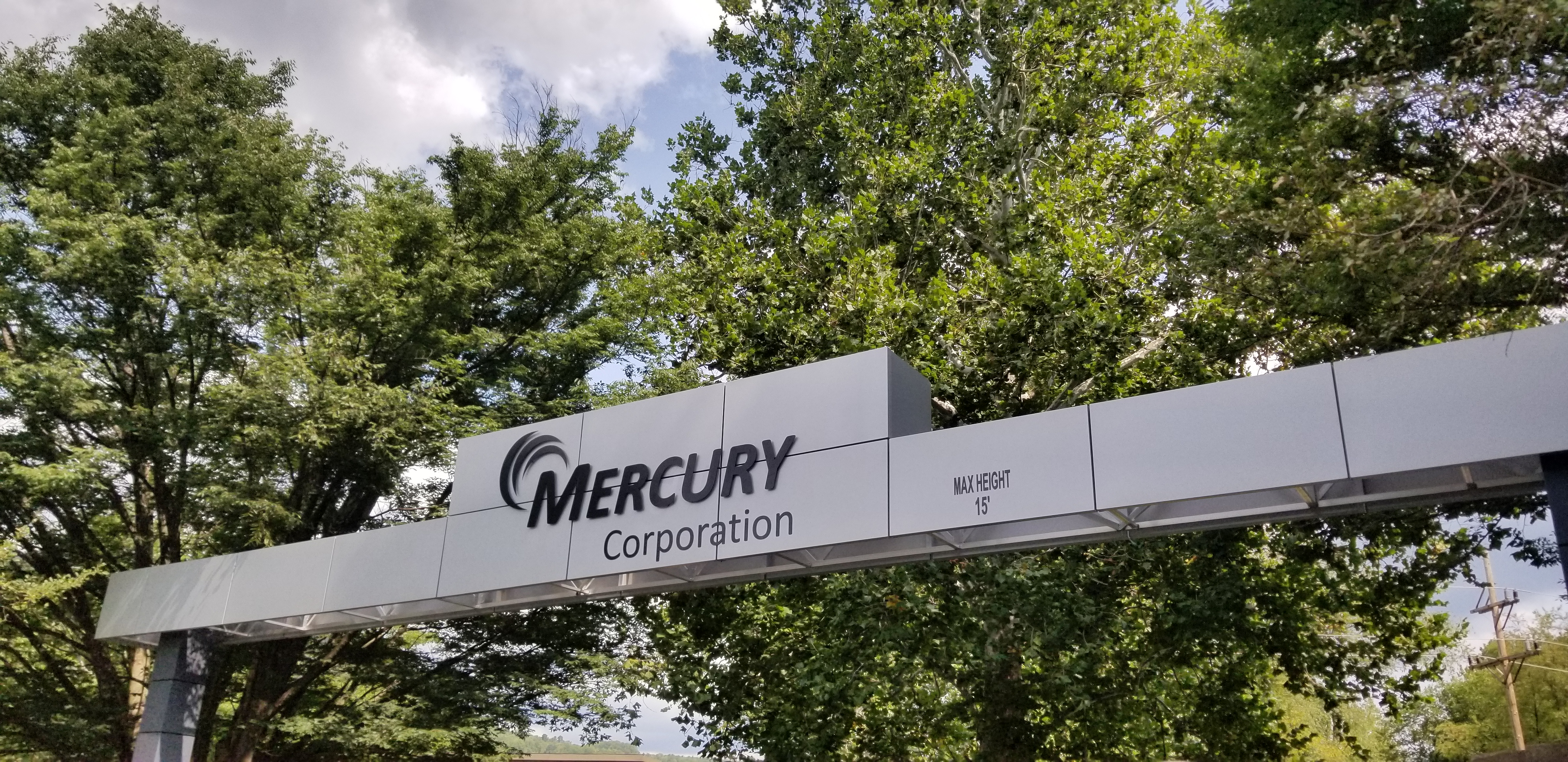
- Mercury Headquarters front archway located in Hammondsport, New York
- Company type: Metal Fabrication
- Industry: Aerospace, General Manufacturing, Metal Manufacturing
- Founded: 1921
- Founder: Henry Kleckler, William Chadeayne
- Headquarters: Hammondsport, New York, United States
- Number of locations: New York, Florida, North Carolina, Minnesota, and Mexico
- Area served: Worldwide
- Services: Custom Manufacturing, Metal Fabrication
- Subsidiaries: Airspeed, LLC

Mercury Corporation was originally an aircraft manufacturer established in Hammondsport, New York, United States in 1920. It built aircraft using the name Mercury Aircraft.

Mercury started as an aircraft supply house selling surplus parts for Curtiss JN-4 aircraft flown after World War I. Once the supply of parts ran out, the company manufactured various aircraft components including radios and dirigible gondolas.

In 1927, the company renamed itself Mercury Aircraft. It was led by Joseph F. Meade, Sr. and Harvey Mummert. In 1928, Mercury came out with the two place all-metal aircraft, the T-2 Mercury Chic for $3500.

With a close relationship to Curtiss aircraft's home. Mercury built a replica of the 1908 AEA June Bug in 1976, flying it in airshows across the country.

Mercury Corporation now operates in multiple locations around the world manufacturing custom and mass-production components.

== Aircraft ==
Summary of aircraft built by Mercury Aircraft
Model name	First flight	Number built	Type
Aerial Mercury Senior	1925	1	Single-engine mailplane
Aerial Mercury Junior	1925	at least 3	3-seat transport or mailplane
Mercury Arrow	1928	xx	Biplane
Mercury Chic T-2	1928	27	Light aircraft
Mercury Kitten	1928	1	Light aircraft
