= Hammondsport, New York =

- Village
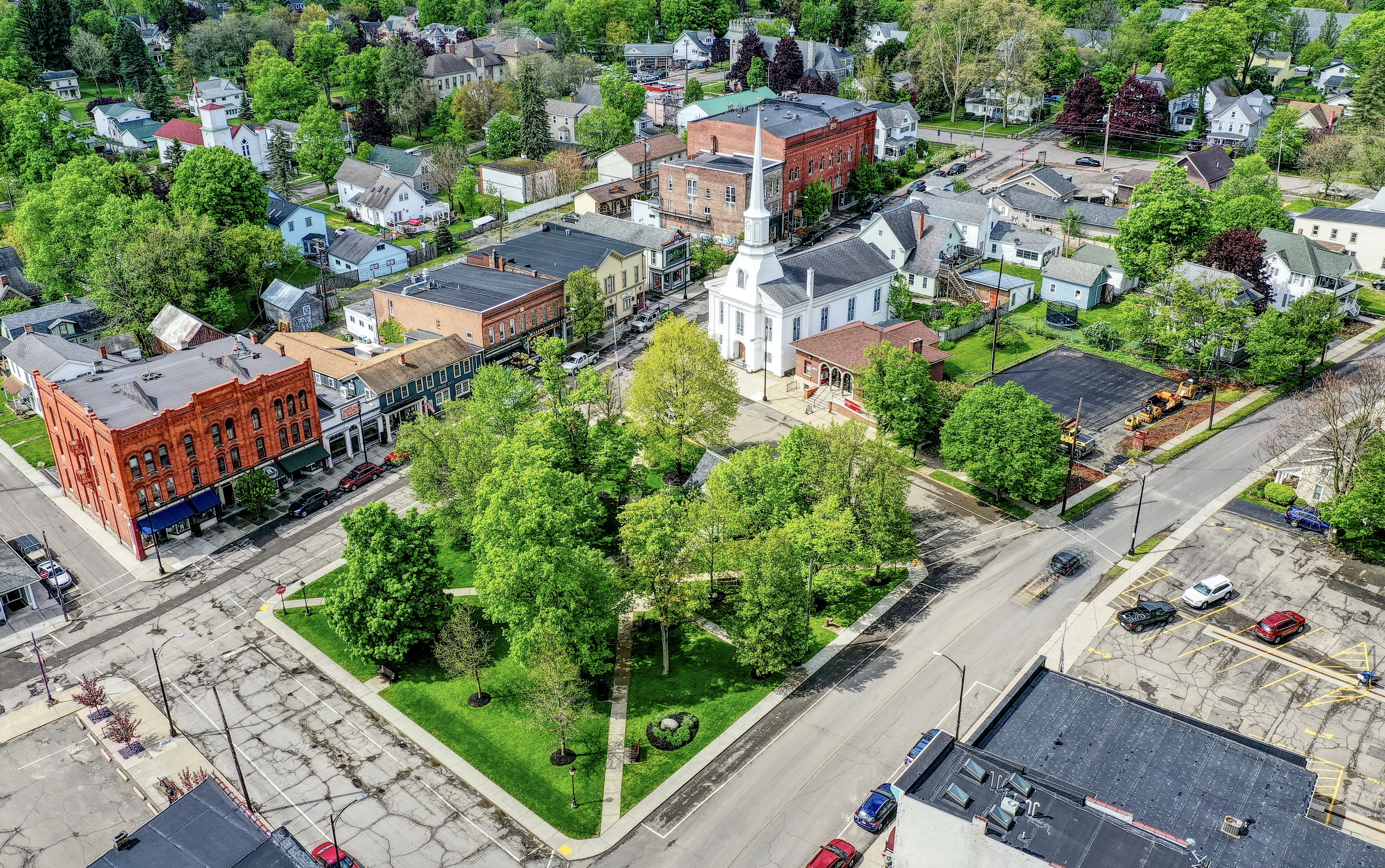
- Village of Hammondsport

- Location within the state of New York
- Coordinates: 42°24′30″N 77°13′25″W
- Country: United States
- State: New York
- County: Steuben
- Town: Urbana

Area
  - Total: 0.37 sq mi (0.96 km^{2})
  - Land: 0.35 sq mi (0.91 km^{2})
  - Water: 0.019 sq mi (0.05 km^{2})
- Elevation: 761 ft (232 m)

Population (2020)
  - Total: 583
  - Density: 1,665.1/sq mi (642.88/km^{2})
- ZIP code: 14840
- Area code: 607
- GNIS feature ID: 2390879
- Website: hammondsport.us

Hammondsport is a village in Steuben County, New York, United States. As of the 2020 census, Hammondsport had a population of 583. First settled in 1792 the village is located at the south end of Keuka Lake, one of the Finger Lakes. Beginning in the 1790s the village began to take form, which included a courthouse and a jail. In the 1850s vineyards and the wine industry began to emerge in and around Hammondsport. Pioneer aviation engineer and pilot Glenn Curtiss was born in Hammondsport, where he built several types of aircraft, and the first seaplanes, which were tested in Keuka Lake. Hammondsport features a village square, historic buildings, wineries, breweries and museums. Nearby municipalities contain vineyards, and wineries and grape-packing have played a major role in the economy. In 1935, heavy rains lasting three days resulted in mudslides and major flooding, ruining or damaging many homes and structures in Hammondsport, situated at the hillside. A number of buildings surrounding Pulteney Square make up the Pulteney Square Historic District and are listed in the National Register of Historic Places

== History ==
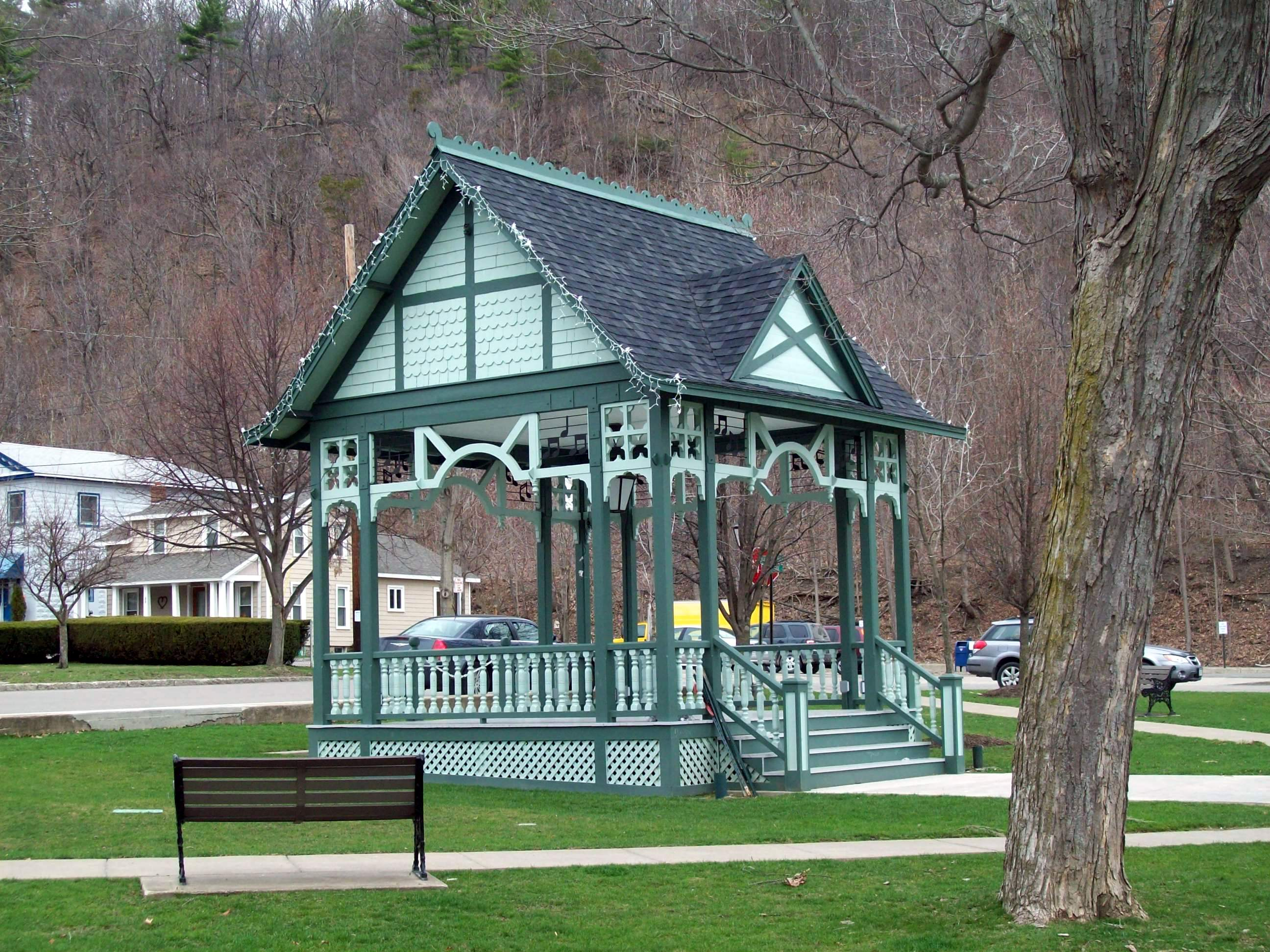
Historic bandstand in Pulteney Square

Hammondsport was settled beginning in 1792 by Samuel Baker, Mr. Aulls and Capt. Amos Stone, and was originally called "Cold Spring Valley", due to its icy-cold spring that emptied into Keuka Lake (then called Crooked Lake) It was also known as Pleasant Valley.

In 1802, General George McClure (Note: General McClure was a member of the NY State Milita and fought several battles during the War of 1812) purchased several hundred acres of land in Pleasant Valley just south of Hammondsport where he built a saw mill, fulling mill, flour mill and carding machine. During this time he opened a store on the site of Hammondsport, which sold goods produced by the mills, thus laying the foundation for future business there. The village was later renamed for Lazerus Hammond, a settler who arrived in 1810 from nearby Dansville. The first building constructed in the valley is still standing. Hammond officially founded the village around 1826, and it was incorporated in 1856. William Hastings, a member of the Presbyterian church, erected the first store, and started a mercantile business. The village became a center for the New York wine industry.

In 1825 the first Christian religious service was held in Hammondsport by Episcopal Reverend Bostwick, who organized the Episcopal Church Society in Hammondsport and resided in a rectory there. In July 1831, Reverend Isaac Flagler, a Presbyterian, arrived and began religious services. On July 25, a Presbyterian religious society was established, and on September 14 a Presbyterian church, consisting of eight members, was organized, by a committee from the Presbyterian church in Bath, consisting of Reverend Isaac W. Piatt, Reverend Samuel White, with the assistance of two elders. During the 1830s other preachers began arriving and established other churches in Hammondsport, receiving financial assistance and guidance from the American Home Missionary Society.

=== Wine industry ===
Reverend Bostwick planted the first grapevines in a garden at his rectory in 1830. He soon discovered that the surrounding region would be ideal for growing imported grape vines and planted the first vines in the slopes around Keuka Lake, which established the wine country and its subsequent wine industry in the western Finger Lakes region. The first townspeople to take vine cuttings from Bostwick's vines were John Poppino, Lemuel Hastings and George McClure. Beginning with Andrew Swartout in 1852, grapes from vineyards around the lake were being shipped by boat to Hammondsport, then by wagons, and then by the Bath & Hammondsport Railroad to where it connected to the Erie Railroad at the Bath railroad station and transported to New York. Subsequently, the demand for fresh grapes in New York increased dramatically, which in turn greatly promoted the wine industry in and around Hammondsport. After the flood of 1935 the Bath & Hammondsport Railroad was purchased by local interests and renamed the B & H Railroad. The railroad remained in operation for 120 years. By 1870, Hammondsport had 3000 acres of vineyards; by 1879, 5000 acres; and by 1889, 14,500 acres. Subsequently, Hammondsport is considered the heart of the grape-growing region in New York.

The Crooked Lake Canal, after much deliberation with state officials, and labor disputes, was completed in three years and opened in 1833, connecting Hammondsport and the Town of Urbana to the Erie Canal. At a width of 42 feet, the canal was built to accommodate the same size boats in use on the Erie Canal. With access via the Seneca Canal to the Erie Canal, which led to the Hudson River, it became possible to ship goods between Hammondsport and New York City by boat. When the Bath and Hammondsport railroad opened in 1874 the canal became obsolete. Subsequently, the canal was financially forced to close in 1877.

=== Village life ===
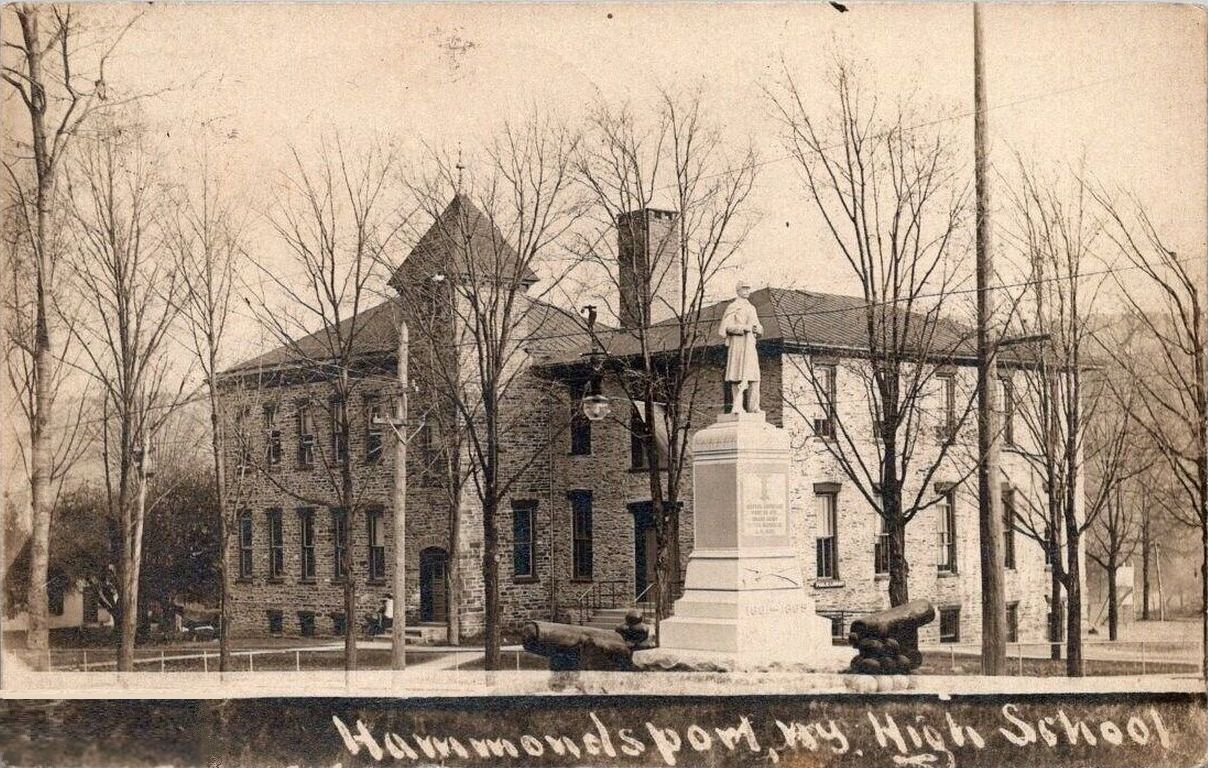
Hammondsport highschool, and Civil War soldier's monument, 1909

The first school-house to appear in Hammondsport was built in 1827 at the location where the St. James (Episcopal) Church exists today. In 1858 a private academy opened in a stone building at the corner of Main and Lake Streets in Hammondsport. The structure was later purchased by the Hammondsport school district around the beginning of the 20th century. Later additions were added to the building on both sides, and thereafter it continued to serve as the Hammondsport school until 1935.

In 1836 Mallory Mill was built by Meridith Mallory on Pulteney Street in Hammondsport. Four stories in height, the stone structure was the second largest free-standing building in New York. It had three water wheels used to power a grist mill. During the winter months, however, operations at the mill stopped due to the freezing water. Subsequently, its life as a grist mill was short lived and after 1840 it was used as a warehouse until 1880 when it was used as a winery by the Glen Wine Company. In 1901 William H. Hallock, owner of the Hallock Bank in Bath, acquired the property. The structure is listed in U.S. National Register of Historic Places

Among the first physicians to practice medicine in Hammondsport were Dr. Ezekiel B. Pulling, Dr. Amasa Church, Dr. C. E. Campbell, Dr. Moses T. Babcock, and Dr. Oliver H. Babeock. Among the first lawyers to live and practice in the village, were Benjamin Bennitt, Benjamin F. Drew, and Monroe Wheeler, Esqs. The first election of village officers was held November 22, 1856, which included William Hastings as senior trustee, and Orlando Shepard, as the town assessor.

The Hamondsport Advertiser, first published in 1838, and the Hammondsport Herald, first published in 1874, were Hammondsport's first newspapers. In 1931 the Hammondsport newspaper, the Keuka Grape Belt, combined with the Hammondsport Herald and Bath Plaindealer, and operated from 1931 to 1940. Published by the Keuka Grape Belt Co., its circulation served Hammondsport and Steuben County.

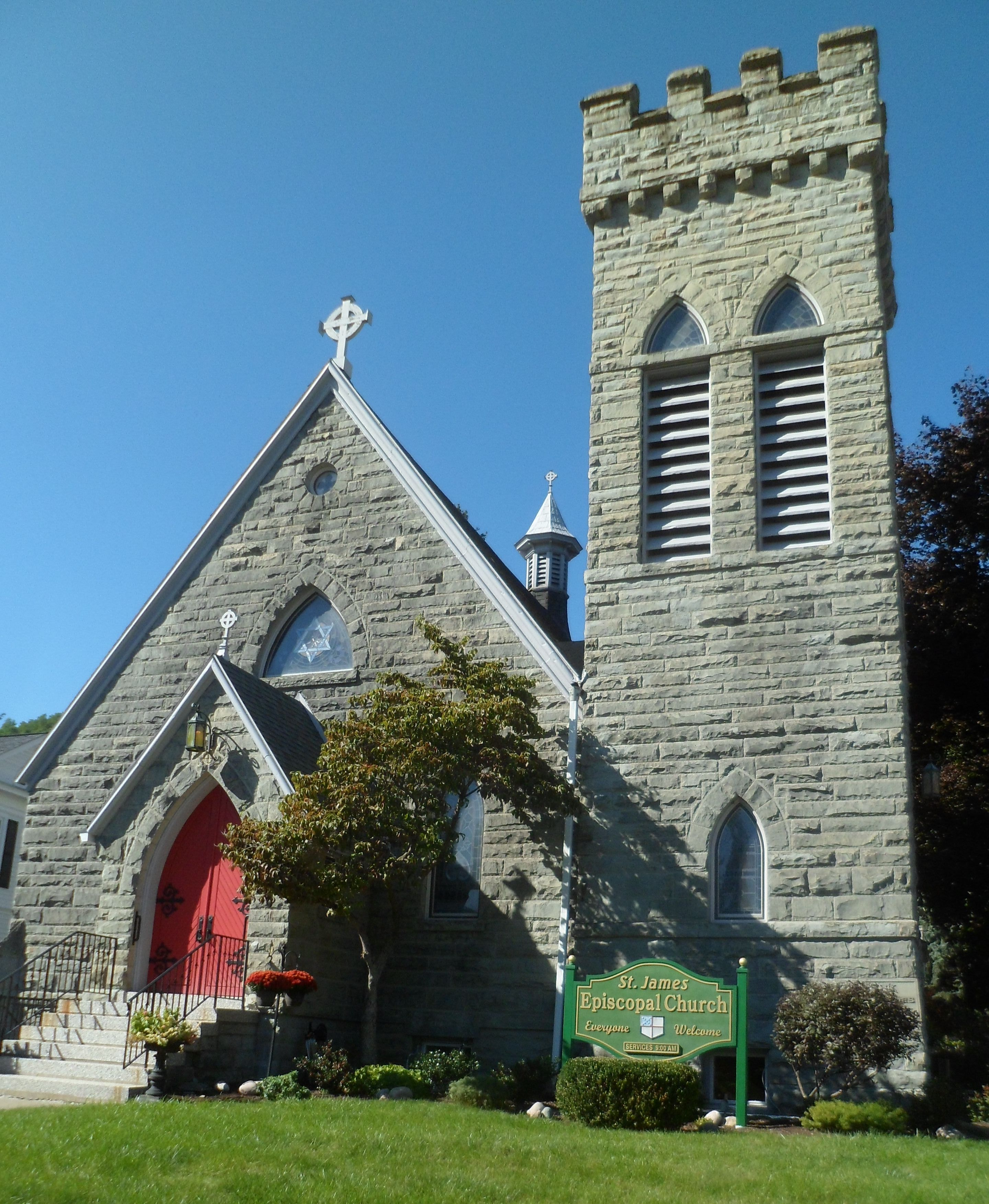
St James Episcopal Church, built in 1895

In 1895 the Saint James Episcopal Church was built. it was the third church, replacing the Episcopal churches that were built in 1833 and 1877. The cornerstone contains documents, including photographs and an 1886 Prayer Book formerly in the cornerstone of the second building.

Beginning in 1894 Hammondsport received its first water system from springs that were contained in the Rufus Scofield farm, on Mt. Washington, not far from the village. Aside from supplying the village with pure spring water, one of the first objectives was to install five fire hydrants at convenient locations about the village. Pressure from the water system came from the gravitational force and the high altitude of the springs.The water system plant was completed in 1865 costing about $25,000, paid for and owned by the village of Hammondsport.

In 1917, the first telephone office was built in Hammondsport which was needed to accommodate the Curtiss Manufacturing Company with its many business involvements.

=== Steamboats ===
Hammondsport, on the shore of Keuka Lake, had several docks that accommodated lake-faring vessels that were typically used for trading and ferrying, transporting people and goods between Hammondsport and Penn Yan. The first vessel to set upon the waters of Keuka Lake was a schooner called The Sally, built in 1808 at Hammondsport by George McClure for the purpose of transporting wheat and other goods from Penn Yan to Hammondsport, where it would be shipped to market in New York. (Note: Various prominent businessmen in the Finger Lakes region criticized McClure for his effort as they felt this prospect ran contrary to the Embargo Act of 1807 imposed on Britain by President Jefferson.) McClure played a fundamental role in Hammondsport's business development. When steam power came into common use there were several steamboats running on Keuka Lake in 1835. The first built was called the Keuka Maid, a sidewheeler of 85 feet in length. In the latter half of the 1800s Hammondsport became the home to various steamboat manufacturers which included A. W. Springstead and the Union Dry Dock Company. In 1892 the Dry Dock company built the Mary Bell, considered "The Queen of Lake Keuka", which was the largest steamboat ever to operate on the lake. Some steamboats met an unusual fate while docked at Hammondsport. The Steuben sank while docked there from a hull that developed leaks due to engine vibration. In 1909 the Cricket caught fire and was damaged beyond repair while docked at Hammondsport. By 1921, with the increased use of gasoline powered trucks and cars, large boat traffic on the lake was no longer economically feasible: The Mary Bell was the last large vessel to make the run between Hammondsport and Penn Yan on opposite ends of the lake.

In the 1850s the farming industry began to decline when the Erie Railroad came through the area, which subsequently reduced lake traffic. During this time, however, viticulture began to materialize as a new and promising industry, as the temperate climate and well-drained soil along the shores of the lake were ideal for growing grapes. Charles Champlin's Pleasant Valley Wine Company was the first vineyard established in the Hammondsport area, which was followed by Walter Taylor's vineyard, and others. Winemakers from France, including Jules D. Masson, who introduced new varieties of grapes from that country. The Bath and Hammondsport Railroad soon emerged, which connected to the Erie Railroad in Bath eight miles south of Hammondsport, which brought in more people and business to Hammondsport.

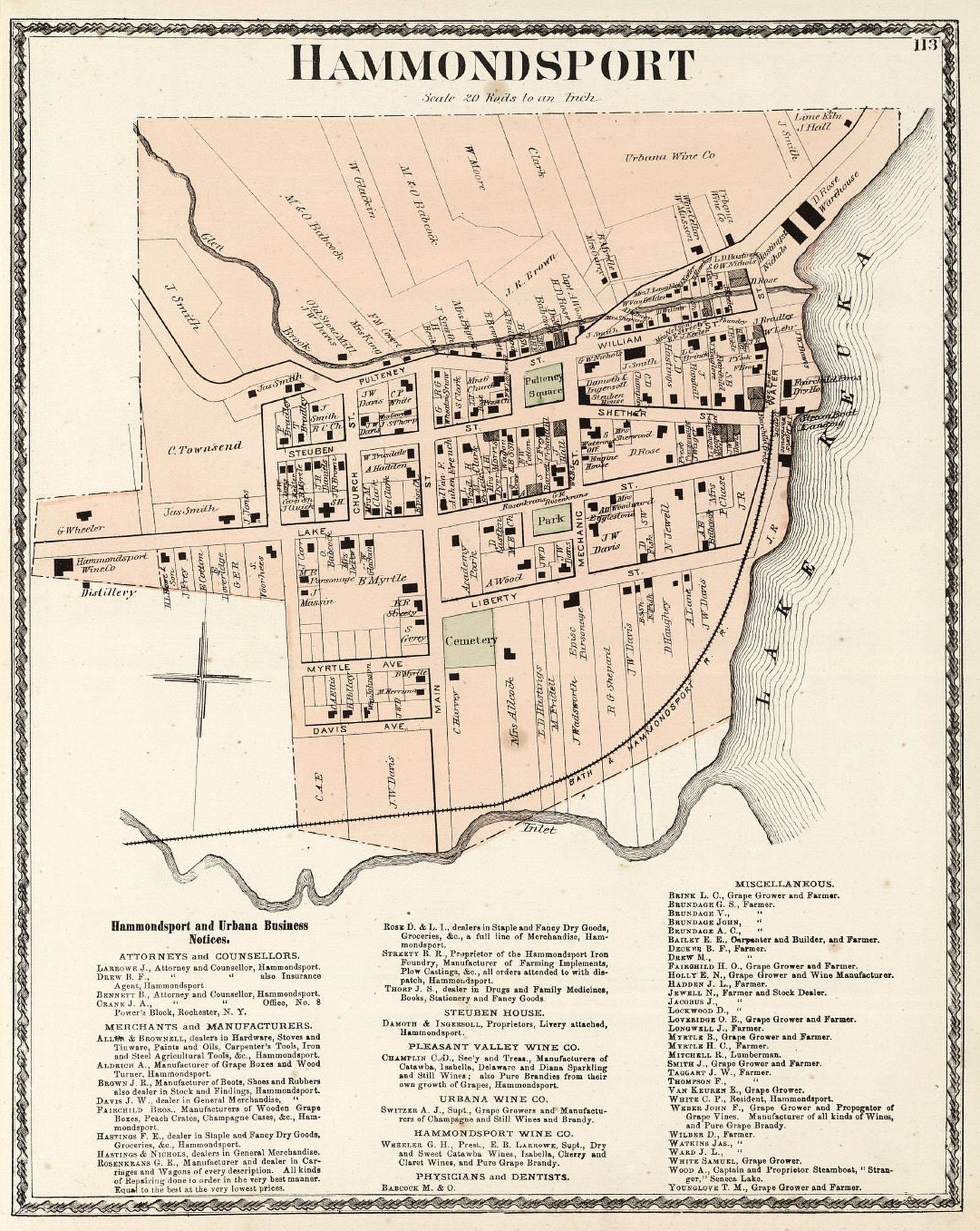
Hammondsport historical map, with listing of businesses

=== Civil War ===
During the American Civil War, with President Lincoln calling for 300,000 volunteers, the 107th New York Infantry Regiment (nicknamed the Campbell Guards), was mustered. Young men from Hammondsport, Bath and Elimra who volunteered for service were assigned to Company G of the regiment which was organized in Elmira, NY. The regiment was mustered into service for three years and left the state to serve on August 13, 1862. (Note: Their initial assignment placed them among the defensive forces around Washington D.C. They were also present at the Battle of Gettysburg and numerous other battles. During its service casualties in the regiment included two officers and fifty men killed in action, two officers and thirty-six men wounded, and five men who died in the hands of the enemy.)

Morris Brown, Jr., a once Hammondsport resident, received the Medal of Honor posthumously on March 6, 1869, for his service in the Union Army at the Battle of Gettysburg, where he daringly captured the Confederate flag. He died in action almost a year later in Virginia. Brown, Jr. was interred at Lakeview Cemetery in Penn Yan at the northern end of Keuka Lake. (Note: Brown's father, Morris brown, Sr., was the Steuben County Assemblyman and Supervisor of Urbana.)

=== Early 20th century ===
By the time World War I began in 1914 the village of Hammondsport included twelve wineries, five grape-packing houses, one barrel making factory, four hotels, five grocery stores, five meat markets, three blacksmiths, two livery stables, five barber shops, three pool halls, three movie houses, two men's clothing stores, three hat shops, three lumber yards, four coal yards, a grist mill, three doctors, two dentists, three lawyers, a chiropractor and a veterinarian and a harness shop, along with the airplane works at the Glenn Curtiss Company.

In 1921, five local men purchased a wood barrel factory just south of the present D.W. Putnam Wine Company, and named it the Aerial Service Corporation. Two of these men, Henry Kleckler, the president and William Chadeayne, vice president, were formerly with the Curtiss Aeroplane Company, known as the Mercury Corporation, established in Hammondsport in 1920.

As the greater part of Hammondsport's economy was dependent on its wineries, the effects of the prohibition from 1919 to 1933 forced many wineries to stop operations, resulting in an overall decline in the wine industry and subsequent unemployment in Hammondsport, which in turn all but closed down the Bath & Hammondsport Railroad, which for years had routinely transported large cargoes of wine and grapes from Hammondsport to other towns.

=== Aviation development ===
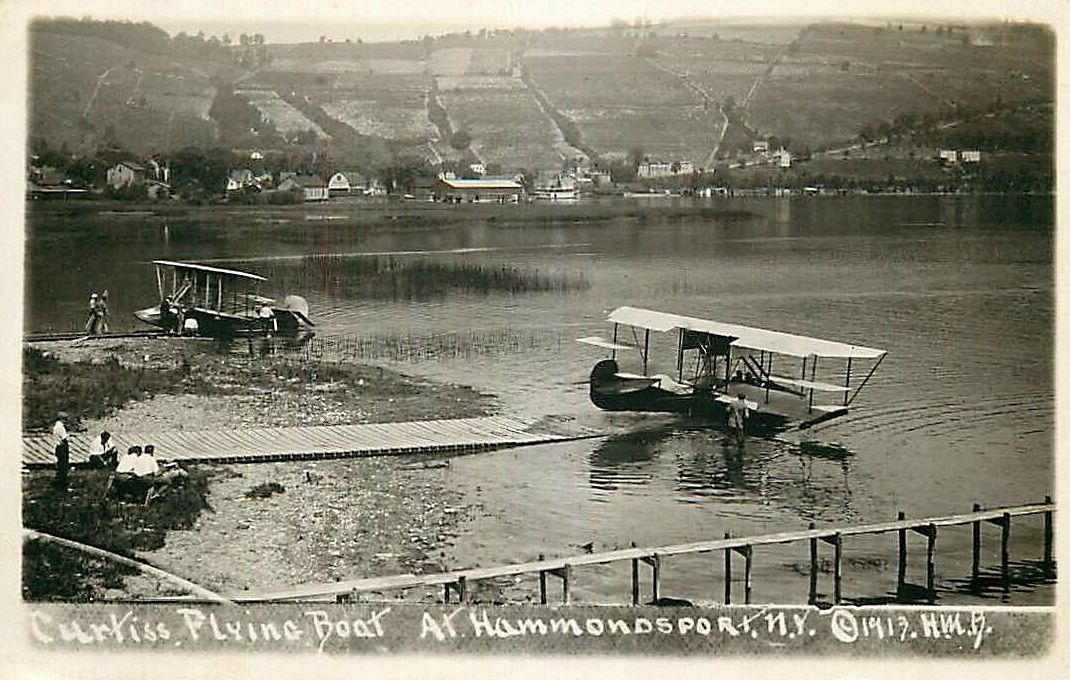
Curtiss' "flying boat" at Hammondsport launch, 1913

Hammondsport was at the center of aviation development during the first years of the 20th century. The Reverend Claudius G. Curtiss, a Methodist minister, arrived at Hammondsport in 1876. He was the grandfather of Glenn Hammond Curtiss, the airplane designer who first developed aircraft capable of taking off and landing in water, who resided at Hammondsport, where he was born in 1878. At this time the population of Hammondsport was almost 1000 people.

Not long after his father died Curtiss married Lena Pearl Neff in the Hammondsport Presbyterian Church. In a vacant storefront owned by Mrs. Benjamin Bennett, co-founder of the Hammondsport Herald, he opened up a bicycle shop across from the bandstand on Pulteney Square, which soon grew into a successful business. Here he developed his own gasoline engine which he later produced in the Curtis Manufacturing Company (CMC) in Hammondsport. Its great success and national notoriety is said to have "put Hammondsport on the map". Later Glenn became a motorcycle and aircraft designer and manufacturer in Hammondsport, and became a recognized expert on gasoline engines. Curtiss' first involvement with aeronautics occurred in 1904, with his association with Thomas Baldwin, a pioneer balloonist, when Curtiss sold him a motorcycle engine to power his balloon. Together they built a large building on Kingsley Flats, a low-lying area between the village and the lake and began manufacturing balloons and dirigibles at Hammondsport.

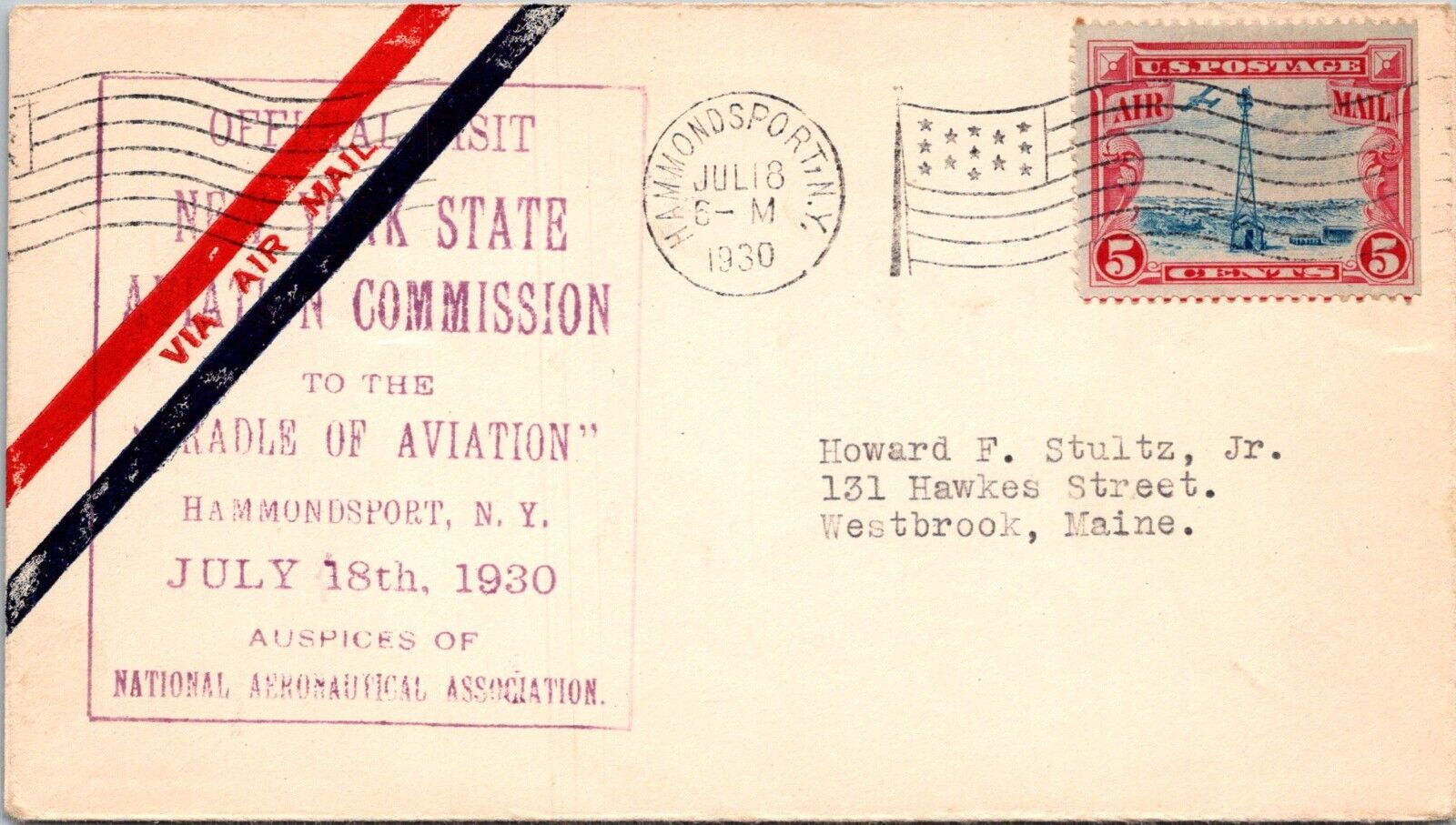
The New York State Aviation Commission came to Hammondsport on an official visit to confer with Curtiss, July 18, 1930 (Note: Their arrival occurred five days before the unexpected death of Curtis, whose pioneering involvement with aircraft prompted their visit)

Early development of aircraft and seaplanes was carried out by Curtiss in his factory at Hammondsport, and who later had joined with Alexander Graham Bell and others in the Aerial Experiment Association. On July 4, 1908, the June Bug, was the first American airplane to fly at least 1 km and was flown by Curtiss from the Hammondsport airfield. The June Bug was later fitted with pontoons and became the first aircraft to perform takeoffs and landings on the water. Hammondsport at Keuka Lake was the site where the first successful flight of a "flying boat" took place in July 1912. The first long distance "flying boat", the America, was also designed by Curtiss and launched in Keuka Lake at Hammondsport in 1914, while the people of Hammondsport and the press gathered to witness the landmark event. This aircraft was again flown by Captain Jim Poel, and co-pilot, Lee Sackett, over Keuka Lake during an exhibition at Hammondsport in 2008 and again in 2009. In 1911 Curtiss founded the first flying school in America at Hammondsport. Here he taught Blanche Stuart Scott how to operate an airplane, who became America's first female pilot. During this time Scott resided in Hammondsport at the home of Curtiss and his family. World War I flying ace, William Thaw, credited with five confirmed and two unconfirmed aerial victories, also attended the Curtiss flying school.

In 1914 another aviation pioneer, Samuel Langley, brought his plane to Hammondsport to be reconditioned by Curtis and flown in a scientific demonstration After a long and distinguished career in aviation Curtiss died unexpectedly in 1930 at the relatively early age of 52. His subsequent funeral service was held in Hammondsport at St. James Episcopal Church, with his interment in the family plot at Pleasant Valley Cemetery, just south of Hammondsport in Urbana. Today the Glenn H. Curtiss Museum, located less than a mile south of Hammondsport on State Road, Rt. 54, houses many examples of Curtiss' airplanes and other inventions.

Henry Kleckler, was the shop foreman at Curtiss' airplane manufacturing works (CMC) in Hammondsport. Curtiss considered Kleckler his "right hand man", and a "master innovator and mechanic" He was also a native of Hammondsport and worked with Curtiss in developing more efficient engines for the "flying boats" pioneered and developed by Curtiss.

On May 19, 1908, Thomas Selfridge, while working with Curtiss in Hammondsport, became the first US military officer to pilot a modern aircraft, when he flew solo in the Aerial Experiment Association's newest aircraft, White Wing, off shore from the village in Keuka Lake. In September of that year, while conducting flying experiments with Orville Wright in Virginia, he was the first member of the military to die in a plane crash.

=== Flood of 1935 ===
Heavy rains in July 1935 caused flooding and damage across much of southern-central New York. With more than 8.0 inches (200 mm) of rain in a 48-hour period, the village of Hammondsport was among those that were subjected to wide spread damage and ruin. During the prolonged heavy rains much water had drained off the adjacent hills and funneled through Glen Brook, which at its end runs parallel between the hillside and Hammondsport before reaching Keuka Lake. The torrents of water coming down through the brook at Hammondsport caused the stone retaining walls to give way, allowing the rushing waters to gouge a channel through some of the dirt roads in the village. The flood killed seven people, five of them children. Among the ruin caused to houses and other structures, the flood also destroyed an old warehouse in the glen that housed the Georges Roulet Winnery, thereby flushing out several hundred barrels of aging brandy into the streets of Hammondsport that were previously stored in the winery during the prohibition years. Great amounts of mud was also deposited on many of the streets, and buried a number of cars, while the railroad line from Bath to Hammondsport was almost completely destroyed. Not long after the flood, the stone walls along Glen Brook in Hammondsport were widened and reinforced with concrete so as withstand heavy rain runoff from the hillside and channel any future flood waters to the lake.

== Geography ==
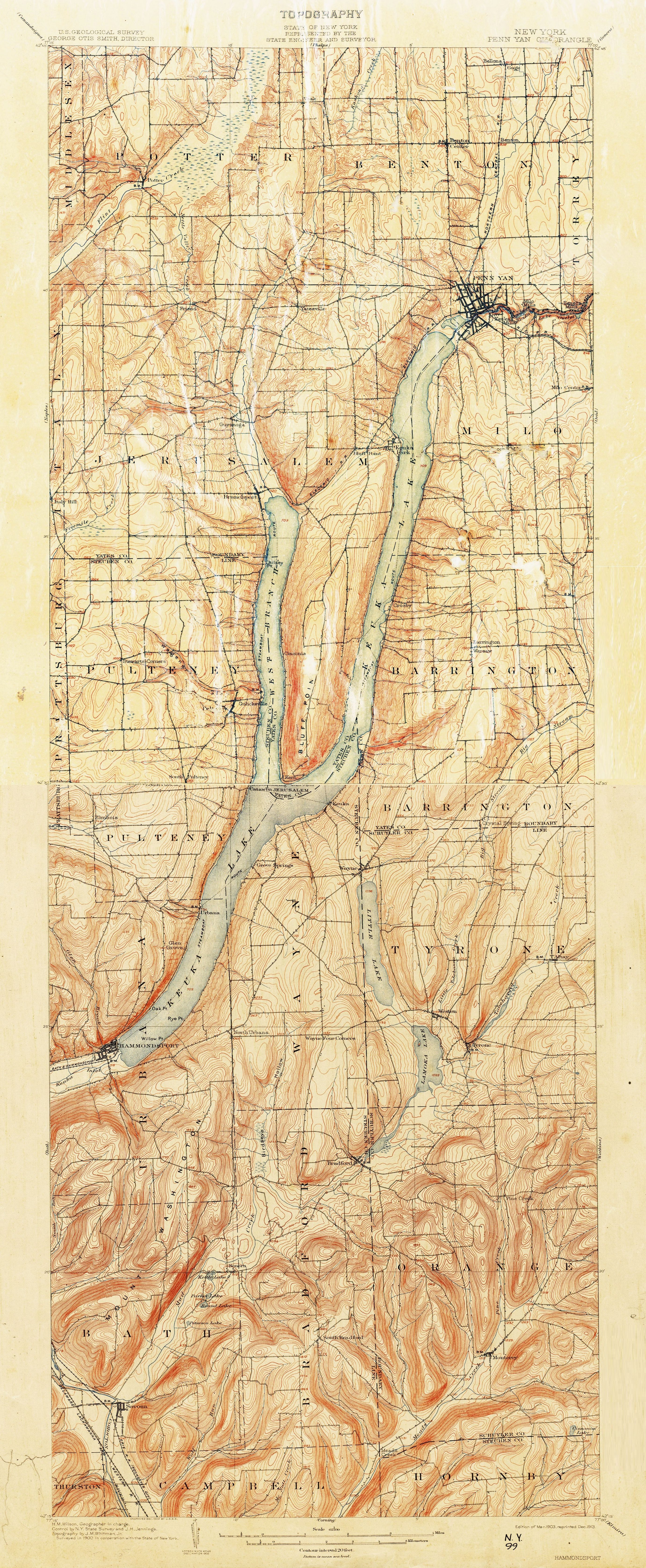
Topographical map of Lake Keuka, courtesy of the U.S. Geological Survey.

According to the United States Census Bureau, the village has a total area of 0.4 square miles (1.0 km^{2}), of which 0.3 square miles (0.78 km^{2}) is land and 0.04 square miles (0.10 km^{2}) (5.41%) is water.

Hammondsport is at the south end of Keuka Lake situated at the foot of one of the long hills that forms the Keuka Lake valley. The village is located north of the junction of New York State Route 54 and New York State Route 54A. NY-54A which passes through the village after linking with County Road 76. Keuka Inlet and Glen Brook flow past the village.

== Demographics ==
Historical population
Census	Pop.	Note	%±
1870	602		—
1880	755		25.4%
1890	934		23.7%
1900	1,169		25.2%
1910	1,254		7.3%
1920	1,060		−15.5%
1930	1,063		0.3%
1940	1,112		4.6%
1950	1,190		7.0%
1960	1,176		−1.2%
1970	1,066		−9.4%
1980	1,065		−0.1%
1990	929		−12.8%
2000	731		−21.3%
2010	661		−9.6%
2020	583		−11.8%
U.S. Decennial Census

At the 2000 census, there were 731 people, 332 households and 200 families residing in the village. The population density was 2,088.5 inhabitants per square mile (806.4/km^{2}). There were 388 housing units at an average density of 1,108.5 per square mile (428.0/km^{2}). The racial makeup of the village was 96.58% White, 1.37% African American, 0.41% Native American, 0.41% Asian, 0.41% from other races, and 0.82% from two or more races. Hispanic or Latino of any race were 0.27% of the population.

There were 332 households, of which 27.1% had children under the age of 18 living with them, 44.3% were married couples living together, 13.3% had a female householder with no husband present, and 39.5% were non-families. 34.6% of all households were made up of individuals, and 14.8% had someone living alone who was 65 years of age or older. The average household size was 2.20 and the average family size was 2.83. 24.1% of the population were under the age of 18, 6.0% from 18 to 24, 24.4% from 25 to 44, 29.7% from 45 to 64, and 15.9% who were 65 years of age or older. The median age was 42 years. For every 100 females, there were 83.2 males. For every 100 females age 18 and over, there were 83.2 males.

The median household income was $38,182 and the family median income was $50,125. Males had a median income of $32,143 and females $28,906. The per capita income for the village was $18,308. About 4.6% of families and 5.8% of the population were below the poverty line, including 11.1% of those under age 18 and 3.5% of those aged 65 or over.

== Notable people ==
- Morris Brown, Jr., recipient of the Medal of Honor for his actions in the American Civil War.
- Glenn Curtiss, aviation pioneer, born 1878 in Hammondsport.
- Charles Champlin, film critic and writer, born in Hammondsport in 1926.
- Joseph M. Champlin, Roman Catholic priest, author and lecturer, born in Hammondsport in 1930.
- John Randolph Kuhl, former Congressman, New York assemblyman and state senator, resides in Hammondsport.
- Emily L. Loveridge (1860–1941), educator, nurse, teacher
- Meredith Mallory, former Congressman.

== Addendum ==
Sites on the National Register of Historic Places are Hammondsport Union Free School, Mallory Mill and the Pulteney Square Historic District.

Much of the 1995 mockumentary Dadetown was filmed in and around Hammondsport.

== Bibliography ==
- Casey, Louis S (1981). Curtiss, the Hammondsport Era, 1907-1915. New York: Crown Publishers. ISBN 978-0-51754-5652.
- Champlin, Charles (1989). Back there where the past was : a small-town boyhood. Syracuse University Press. ISBN 978-0-81560-6123.
- Child, Hamilton (1868). Gazetteer and business directory of Steuben County, N.Y., for 1868-9. Syracuse: Child.
- Clayton, W. Woodford (1879). History of Steuben county, New York, with illustrations and biographical sketches of some of its prominent men and pioneers. Philadelphia: Lewis, Peck & Co.
- Cummins, Julie (2001). Tomboy of the air : daredevil pilot Blanche Stuart Scott. New York: HarperCollins Publishers. ISBN 978-0-06029-2430.
- Curtiss, Glenn (1922). The Curtiss Aviation Book 1912. New York: Fredericj A. Stokes Company.
- Dumas (March 1990). "Along the Outlet of Keuka Lake". The Crooked Lake Review.
- Hakes, Harlo (1896). Landmarks of Steuben County, New York. Syracuse, N.Y.: D. Mason & Co.
- Hatch, Alden (2007). 'Glenn Curtiss: Pioneer of Aviation'. Guilford, Connecticut: The Lyons Press. ISBN 978-1-59921-1459..
- Hotchkin, James Harvey (1848). A history of the purchase and settlement of western New York : and of the rise, progress and present state of the Presbyterian Church in that section. New York: M.W. Dodd.
- House, Kirk W. (2003). Hell-Rider to King of the Air. SAE International. ISBN 9780-7-68081-343.
- Johnson, Hollister (1936). The New York State Flood of July 1935 (PDF). United States Department of the Interior.
- McMaster, Guy Humphrey (1853). History of the settlement of Steuben County, N.Y. : including notices of the old pioneer settlers and their adventures. Bath, N.Y.: R.S. Underhill & Co.
- Merrill, Arch (1944). The Lakes Country. Rochesster, New York: Louis Heindl & Son.
- Mitchell, Charles R (2001). Glenn H. Curtiss, aviation pioneer. Charleston, SC: Arcadia. ISBN 978-0-73850-5190.
- —— (2002). Keuka Lake. Arcadia Publishing. ISBN 978-0-73851-0958.
- Molson, K. M (1995). The Curtiss HS flying boats. Ottawa: National Aviation Museum. ISBN 978-0-66012-0157.
- Near, Irvin W. (1911). A history of Steuben County, New York, and its people. Vol. I. Chicago: Lewis Publishing Company.
- Near, Irvin W. (1911). A history of Steuben County, New York, and its people. Vol. II. Chicago: Lewis Publishing Company.
- Palmer, Richard F. (November 1994). "Bath & Hammondsport Railroad". The Crooked Lake Review.
- Palmer, Richard (Fall 1998). "A Schooner on Crooked Lake". The Crooked Lake Review.
- Sherer, Richard (January 1989). "Finger Lakes Grape Pioneers". The Crooked Lake Review.
- —— (September 1990). "Early Schools in Pleasant Valley and Hammondsport". The Crooked Lake Review.
- —— (August 1995). "An Excursion on the Keuka Maid". The Crooked Lake Review.
- Shilling, Donovan A. (November 1999). "Bully Hill and The Glenn Curtiss Museum, Hammondsport, New York". The Crooked Lake Review.
- Shulman, Seth (2002). Unlocking the sky : Glenn Hammond Curtiss and the race to invent the airplane. New York: HarperCollins Publishers. ISBN 0-06-019633-5.
- Treichler, Bill (February 1996). "Mallory's Mill". The Crooked Lake Review.
- Trimble, William F. (2010). Hero of the air : Glenn Curtiss and the birth of naval aviation. Annapolis, Md.: Naval Institute Press. ISBN 978-1-59114-8791.
- "Harlan James (Jim) Poel". Smithsonian National Air and Space Museum.
- "Curtiss OX-5, V-8 Engine". Smithsonian National Air and Space Museum.
- "St. James' Church History Hammondsport, New York".
- "150 Years of Progress, Hammondsport, NY" (PDF).
- "Pleasant Valley Cemetery". The Painted Hills Genealogy Society. 2022.
- "U.S. Census website". United States Census Bureau.
- "Hammondsport, New York - National Archives Search Results". search.archives.gov.
- "Census of Population and Housing". Census.gov.
- Mahood, Wayne (Winter 2005). "Morris Brown, Jr., is a Hero". Crooked Lake Review.
- "Newspaper History". Steuben County, New York Genealogy and History.
- "Keuka Grape Belt (Hammondsport, N.Y.) 1940-1942". Library of Congress.
- "Dr. Konstantin Frank Winery". 2023. "Address: 9749 Middle Road, Hammondsport, NY 14840"
- Bretherton, Terry (2023). "Town of Urbana, Steuben County, New York est. 1822". Archived from the original on October 7, 2023.
- "The Untimely Death of the Conqueror of the Pacific". Air Corps News Letter. Vol. 21, no. 2. January 15, 1938.
