= Fjelde =

The surname Fjelde may refer to:

- Pål Fjelde (born 1994), Norwegian footballer
- Jacob Fjelde (1855–1896), Norwegian born American sculptor
- Pauline Fjelde (1861–1923), Norwegian born American painter, embroiderer, and textile artist
