= Minnehaha =

Fictional Native American woman documented in Longfellow's poem The Song of Hiawatha

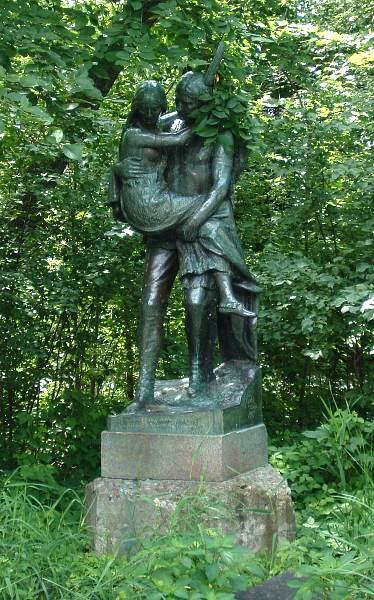
Hiawatha and Minnehaha, 1912 sculpture by Jacob Fjelde near Minnehaha Falls in Minneapolis, Minnesota

Minnehaha (/mɪniˈhɑːhɑː/ mih-nee-HAH-hah; Dakota: Mníȟaȟa, ['mniχaχa]) is a Native American character in Henry Wadsworth Longfellow's 1855 epic poem The Song of Hiawatha. She is the lover of the titular protagonist Hiawatha and comes to a tragic end. The name, often said to mean "laughing water", literally translates to "waterfall" or "rapid water" in Dakota.

The figure of Minnehaha inspired later art works such as paintings, sculpture and music. "The Death of Minnehaha" is a frequent subject for paintings. Minnehaha Falls and her death scene inspired themes in the New World Symphony by Antonín Dvořák. Longfellow's poem was set in a cantata trilogy, The Song of Hiawatha in 1898–1900 by the African-English composer Samuel Coleridge-Taylor. Longfellow's poem also inspired Hugo Kaun's symphonic poems "Minnehaha" and "Hiawatha" composed in 1901.

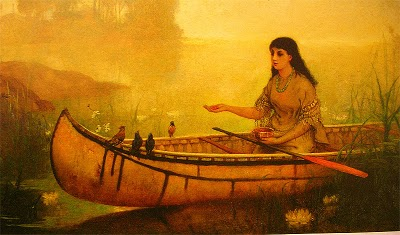
Minnehaha Feeding Birds, Frances Anne Hopkins, ca. 1880

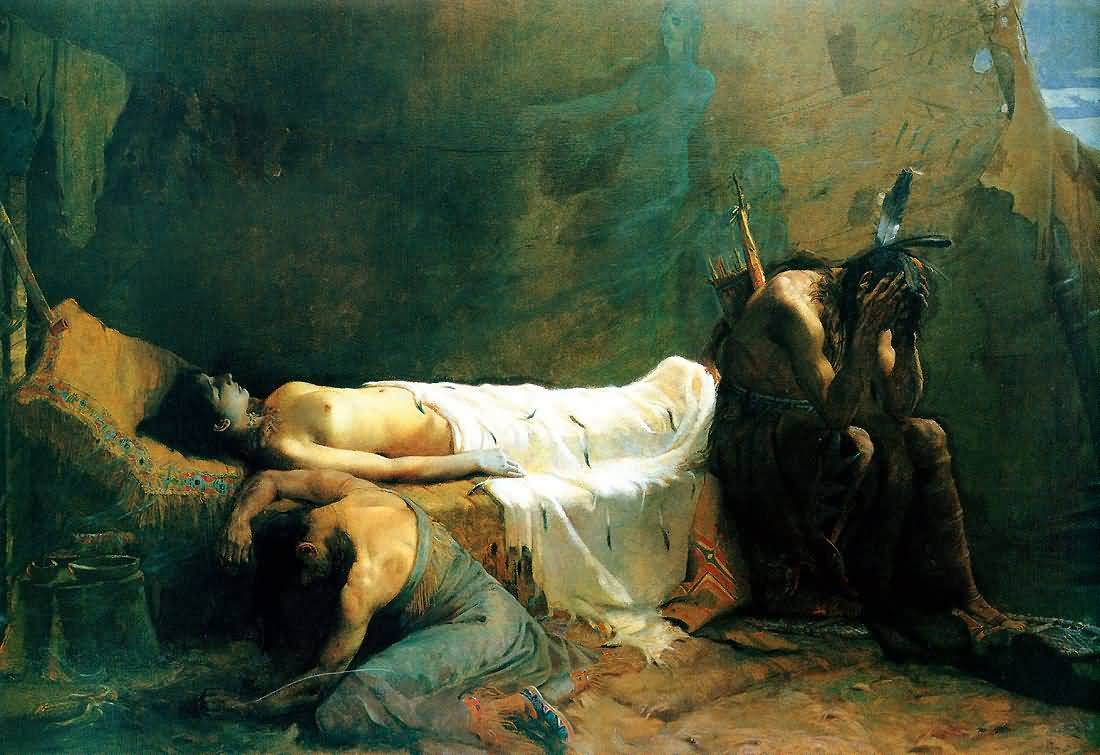
Death of Minnehaha by William de Leftwich Dodge, 1885

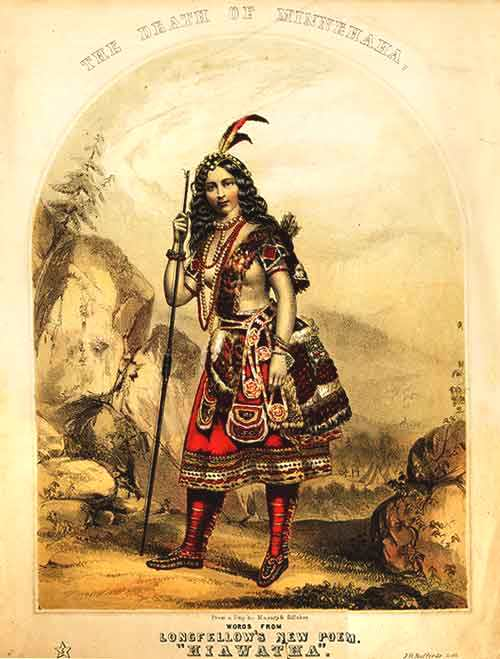
John Henry Bufford's cover for The Death of Minnehaha, 1856

== Minnehaha as a name ==
The character's name has been bestowed upon things, especially in the Great Lakes region of the United States. A ship bearing the name Minnehaha wrecked off the western shore of Lake Michigan in 1893, only 38 years after Longfellow's poem was published. A Minnehaha Bay adjoins the small town of Sturgeon Falls in Ontario, Canada.

Minneapolis claims Minnehaha Falls, Minnehaha Park, Minnehaha Creek, Minnehaha Academy, and a boat bearing her name once operated by Twin City Rapid Transit on Lake Minnetonka, which has now been restored and is currently operated by Museum of Lake Minnetonka. Minnehaha Avenue and Hiawatha Avenue run parallel to each other from downtown Minneapolis, while another Minnehaha Avenue runs through Saint Paul.

In Sault Ste. Marie, Ontario, Canada, Minnehaha Falls and the adjacent Hiawatha Highlands are named after Minnehaha and Hiawatha.

Farther west, Minnehaha, Washington stands near Vancouver. Her name is also linked to Minnehaha County in South Dakota and Minnehaha Covenant Church and Minnehaha Park in Spokane, Washington. Lake Minnehaha is located in the center of Holliday Park in Cheyenne, Wyoming. Arizona's Bradshaw Mountains contain a Minnehaha Flat.

Toward the Atlantic coast, a Minnehaha Island stands in the Potomac River in Montgomery County, Maryland (39.025°N 77.24444°W). A creek known as Minnehaha Branch empties into the Potomac at Glen Echo, Maryland. The town of Minnehaha Springs stands in Pocahontas County, West Virginia. Farther south, Minnehaha Falls in Lakemont, Georgia near Lake Rabun features a 100-foot cascading waterfall. Florida is home to two lakes named Minnehaha: one in the Clermont Chain of lakes in Clermont, Florida, one of the Outstanding Florida Waterbodies; the other in Maitland, Florida, linked to the Winter Park lake chain.

Minne Ha Ha is also the name of a fully functional steamboat operated on Lake George in New York by the Lake George Steamboat Company. Additionally, the name is the basis for the hamlet, Minnehaha, New York in the Adirondacks.

Minnehaha's name has proven inspirational beyond the North American continent: Minnehaha Rock was a phantom island between Easter Island and Sala y Gómez Island in Chile. Two avenues in suburbs of Auckland, New Zealand, in Titirangi and Takapuna, are named for the figure. Minnehaha Falls may be found in Katoomba, Australia.

South African sailor Kirsten Neuschäfer won the 2022 Golden Globe Race using a sailboat named the Minnehaha.

== In popular culture ==
Minnehaha is referenced in the 1967 Batman television series episode "Catwoman's Dressed to Kill", first aired on December 14, 1967.

The fashion show host talks about mini skirts, mini shoes ect. Batwoman buts in "Minihaha".

Minnehaha is also the main character of the Adventures in the Old West four-book series by Emilio Salgari, Sulle Frontiere del Far-West (1908), La Scotennatrice (1909), Le Selve Ardenti (1910), and La Vendetta di Minnehaha (?).

In its Germanized form, Mine-Haha, the name was used by the German writer Frank Wedekind for the heroine of his 1903 novella Mine-Haha, or On the Bodily Education of Young Girls.

Minnehaha is mentioned in British glam rock band The Sweet's song "Wig-Wam Bam" (1972), in which she seduces Hiawatha.

In the popular 1992 Disney movie The Mighty Ducks, Coach Gordon Bombay plays for the fictional “Minnehaha Waves” hockey team during Gordon Bombay's minor league career. The “Minnesota Miracle Man” was one step away from the NHL before a knee injury derailed his career and sent him back behind the bench.
