= Hiawatha and Minnehaha =

Sculpture in Minneapolis, Minnesota

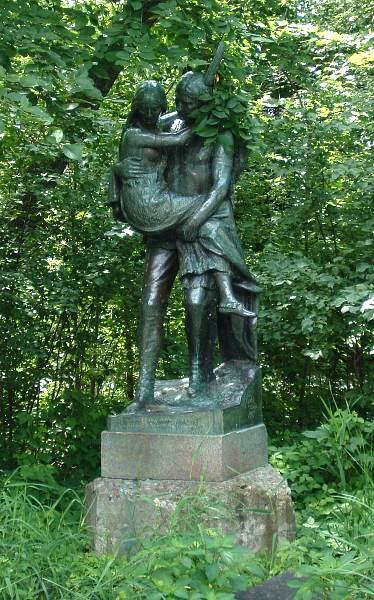
- Artist: Jacob Fjelde
- Year: 1912
- Type: Sculpture
- Medium: Bronze
- Subject: Hiawatha and Minnehaha
- Location: Minneapolis, Minnesota, U.S.; 44.9155°N 93.2117°W

Hiawatha and Minnehaha is a sculpture by Jacob Fjelde that has stood in Minnehaha Park in Minneapolis since the early twentieth century. Now a popular fixture of the park, its placement there was originally controversial.

In 1855, Henry Wadsworth Longfellow published a book-length poem entitled The Song of Hiawatha. Longfellow never visited Minnesota, but he set his poem among the Ojibwe and Dakota of the region. The poem's story line was based on traditional Haudenosaunee (Iroquois) tales, as recorded, sometimes incorrectly, by Henry Rowe Schoolcraft. The Song of Hiawatha was widely read and had significant cultural influence in the United States through the rest of the nineteenth century and into the twentieth century.

Accomplished Norwegian sculptor Jacob Fjelde immigrated to Minnesota in 1887, following family members to the area. He established a studio in Minneapolis and began receiving public and private commissions. One commission was to create a sculpture for the Minnesota Building at the 1893 World's Columbian Exposition in Chicago. Fjelde chose to create Hiawatha and Minnehaha, a plaster sculpture illustrating a particular section of Longfellow's poem, The Song of Hiawatha. This work was installed at the entrance of the Minnesota Building for the duration of the 1893 Exposition. Then, it was put on display in the Minneapolis Public Library.

Fjelde's expenses for Hiawatha and Minnehaha were paid for by small donations collected from Minnesota schoolchildren. Mrs. L.P. (Lizzie) Hunt, a founding member of the Mankato Art History Club and later an official art critic for the state, organized the fund-raising drive.

Beginning in 1902, an informal public campaign was launched to cast Fjelde's original plaster Hiawatha and Minnehaha sculpture in bronze and place it in Minneapolis's Minnehaha Park, near the falls mentioned in Longfellow's poem. Critics of the move said that the piece was "flawed," specifically that the features of Hiawatha and Minnehaha were not Indian enough. Fjelde had struggled to find American Indian people to model the faces after, and he relied on photographs to guide his work. The sculptor died in 1896, so significant changes to the sculpture were no longer possible by 1902.

The debate continued until 1912, when the sculpture finally was cast, then installed and unveiled in a public ceremony at Minnehaha Park on October 5. Charles M. Loring, the first president of the Board of Park Commissioners for the Minneapolis Park System, gave a dedicatory speech. Local schoolchildren sang and recited parts of Longfellow's poem as part of the program.

Fjelde's Hiawatha and Minnehaha soon became a visitor attraction in the park, and postcards depicting it were widely available. As of 2021, the sculpture remains in its location along Minnehaha Creek and is one of Fjelde's best-known works.
