= John Harrington Stevens House =

Historic house in Minnesota, United States

- U.S. Historic district – Contributing property
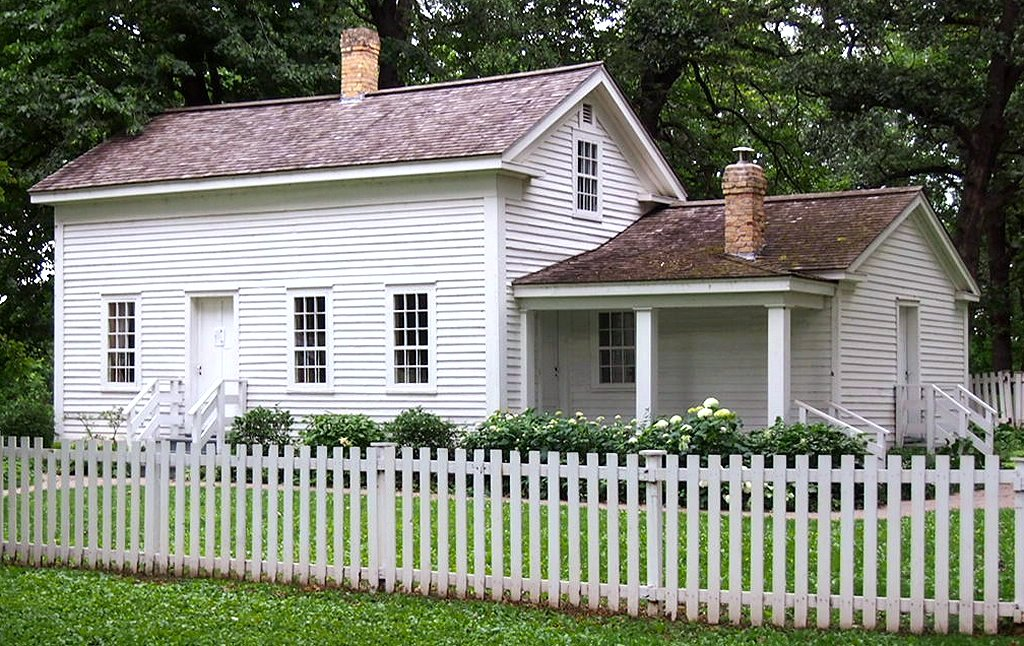
- Stevens' house, now located in Minnehaha Park

- Location within Minnesota Location within the United States
- Interactive map showing the location of John Harrington Stevens House
- Location: Minneapolis, Minnesota
- Coordinates: 44°54′50″N 93°12′35″W
- Built: 1849
- Architectural style: Greek Revival
- Part of: Minnehaha Historic District (ID69000369)
- Designated CP: November 25, 1969

The John Harrington Stevens House is a historic structure in the U.S. state of Minnesota. Named for John H. Stevens, it was the first authorized house on the west bank of the Mississippi River in what would become Minneapolis. The house is the second oldest remaining wood-frame house in Minneapolis (the Ard Godfrey house is older). The house is part of the Minnehaha Historic District and managed by the Minneapolis Park and Recreation Board. The structure was heavily damaged by three acts of arson in 2022.

== History ==
=== "Birthplace of Minneapolis" ===
The house was built in 1850 at Saint Anthony Falls by the same carpenter that built the Ard Godfrey house. It was located just downstream from present day Hennepin Ave. and near West River Parkway (between the Hennepin Ave. Bridge and the Post Office). Stevens was granted permission to build his house on land controlled by Fort Snelling in exchange for providing ferry service across the river, accounting for the nickname "ferry farm." He and his wife, Frances Helen, had no white neighbors, but Native people were often seen nearby.That probably ended in 1851 with the Treaty of Traverse des Sioux. Stevens then claimed 160 acres along the west bank from Bassett's Creek (near Plymouth Ave.) to 2nd Avenue S. In 1855 the claim (and many other claims for west bank land) was granted. The Stevens home became a hub of civic and social activity, and was dubbed the "birthplace of Minneapolis." In the Stevens' home, the name Minneapolis was chosen, Hennepin County and the Minneapolis school district were organized, and the idea for a state fair originated. When Stevens sold his house in the early 1860s the area from Hennepin Ave. to 2nd St. S rapidly filled up with buildings in an area now called the Gateway Residential District (which was later replaced with railroad tracks).

=== Preservation ===
The Stevens House was moved to near 1st Ave. S and 1st St. in 1872 then moved to 16th Ave. S. in 1881. It was discovered as a historic property and in 1896 moved to Minnehaha Park by thousands of school kids, in relays, along with ten horses. In 1982 it was moved to its present location in Minnehaha Park. The home is part of the Minnehaha Historic District, which was listed on the National Register of Historic Places in 1969. The house was a museum, with tours available on summer weekends.

The house was placed under the jurisdiction of the Minneapolis Park and Recreation Board. In 2022, the Star Tribune reported on its deteriorating condition with repairs tentatively planned for the future.

=== Arson ===
The house was damaged by three arson attacks in 2022. A fire on August 30 heavily damaged the building's back side, but preservationists determined it could be rebuilt. A fire on September 20 affected part of the exterior. Initial work on the renovation was underway when another suspicious fire on October 1 burned the first and second floors and part of the roof.

== Gallery ==
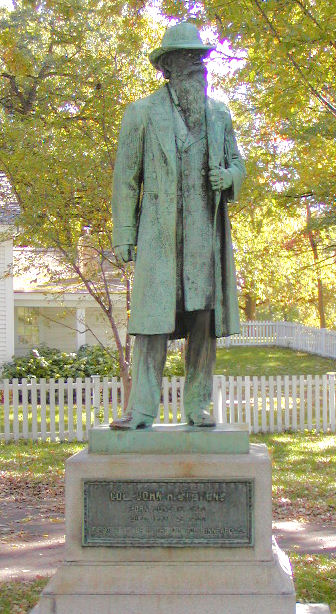
John H. Stevens statue, located at Minnehaha Park

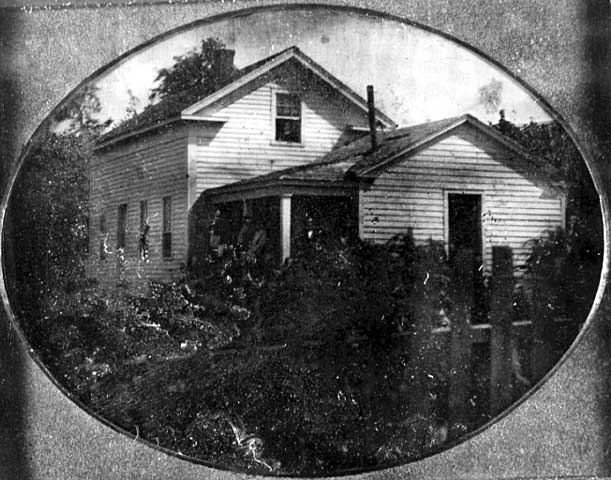
Daguerreotype of house in 1855

Plaque showing early locations of Stevens' house

1886 - Stevens house being moved to Minnehaha Park pulled by thousands of school kids (Minnesota Historical Society)
