= Alexander Hesler =

American photographer (1823–1895)

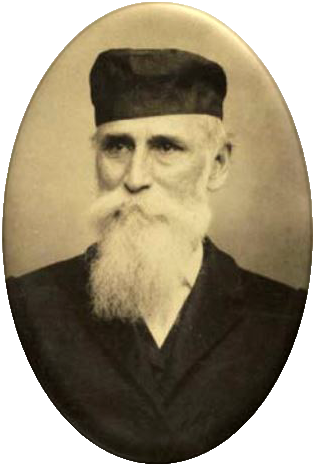
- Born: July 12, 1823; Montréal, Québec, Upper Canada
- Died: July 5, 1895 (aged 71); Evanston, Illinois, U.S.
- Resting place: Mound Cemetery, Racine, Wisconsin, U.S.
- Notable work: Various photographs and portraits of Abraham Lincoln
- Style: Tintype and daguerreotype
- Movement: Early photography

Alexander Hesler or Hessler (July 12, 1823 – July 5, 1895) was a Canadian American photographer active in the U.S. state of Illinois. He is best known for photographing, in 1858 and 1860, definitive iconic images of the beardless Abraham Lincoln.

== Biography ==
Hesler was born in Montreal. He was active in the 1850s and early 1860s, and learned daguerreotype and ambrotype photography; however, in company with many of his fellow craftspeople, he was trained in glass plate photography in the 1850s and specialized in it thereafter. He operated studios in Galena, Chicago and Springfield, Illinois, and took images of people and scenes in Illinois. Using a portable darkroom, he also produced landscape scenes from nearby states and territories of what is now the American Midwest.

Hesler's known portraits include photographs of the two chief Illinois political figures of his day, Lincoln and federal senator Stephen A. Douglas. In the 1860 presidential election, Lincoln's friends took steps to have Hesler's images copied and recirculated, cementing their stature as works of Lincoln image-making.

Hesler's portable darkroom work included a widely circulated image of Minnehaha Falls, a waterfall located in what was to become the U.S. city of Minneapolis.^{:3}^{0–31} While in Minnesota Territory Hesler became the mentor of Joel Emmons Whitney who became Saint Paul's first collodion process photographer.^{:3}^{0–31}^{:45}

== Legacy ==
Hesler was a photographer whose goal was to create photographs of lasting artistic value. He was recognized for the quality of both his portrait work and his outdoor photography. Upon Hesler's retirement in 1865, he transferred his Chicago studio and negatives to a fellow photographer, George Bucher Ayres. Several of Hesler's best-known images of Lincoln are platinum prints produced by Ayres from Hesler negatives.

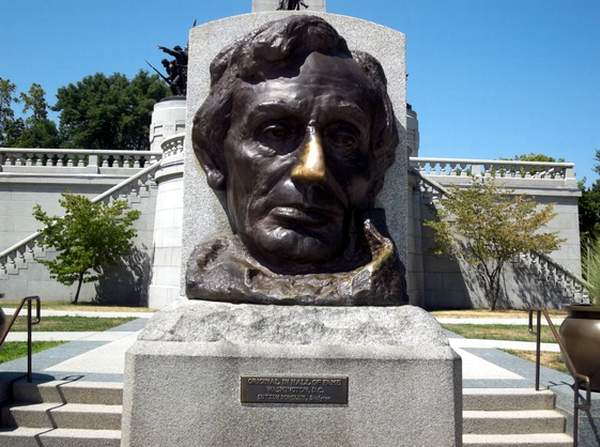
Gutzon Borglum bust, 1908.

Hesler's 1860 glass-plate negatives were used after Lincoln's death as bases for further images of the President, including busts by sculptors such as Gutzon Borglum.

Alexander Hesler is buried in Racine, Wisconsin. A short documentary film about Mound Cemetery, where he is buried, will release in 2014 and features a segment on Hesler.

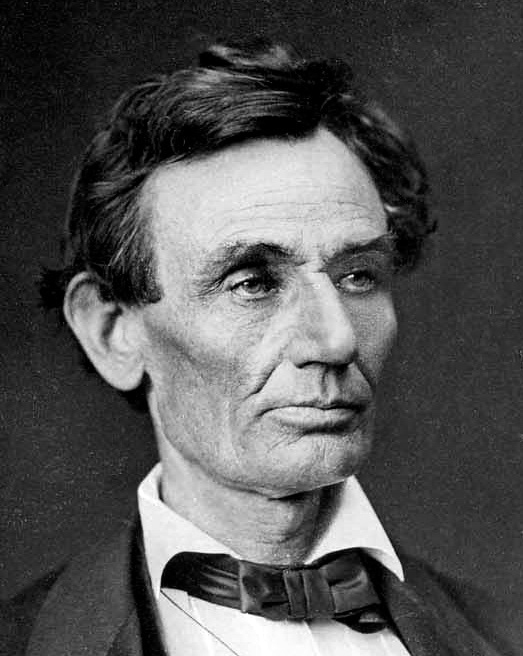
Alexander Hesler photographed Lincoln in 1860.

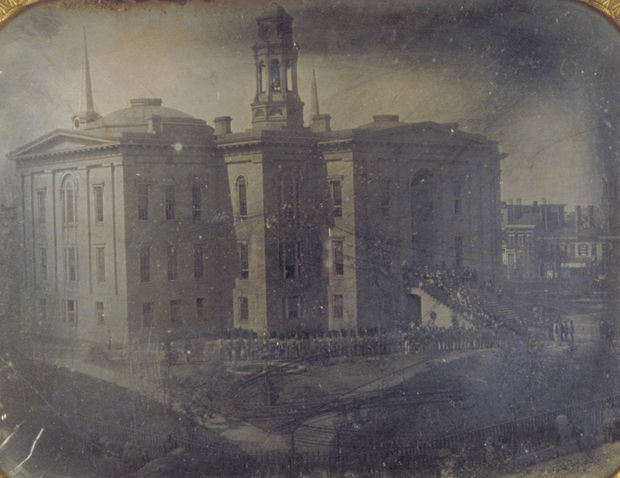
A daguerreotype of the Cook County Court House and City Hall in 1855. Believed to be the oldest surviving architectural photoraph taken in Chicago.

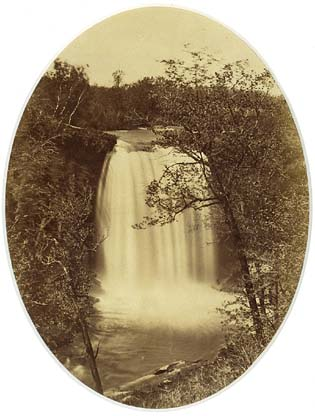
Hesler depicted Minnehaha Falls in 1855.

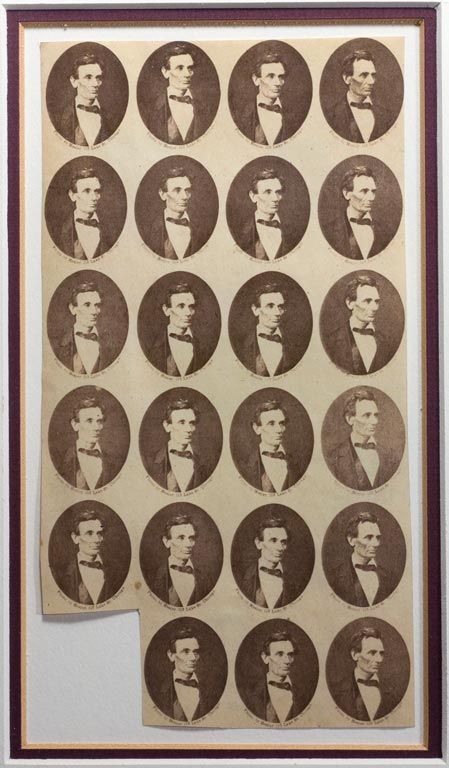
Hesler-Lincoln, salt-printed for 1860 campaign use.
