= Minnehaha Park (Minneapolis) =

- Minnehaha Historic District
- U.S. National Register of Historic Places
- U.S. Historic district
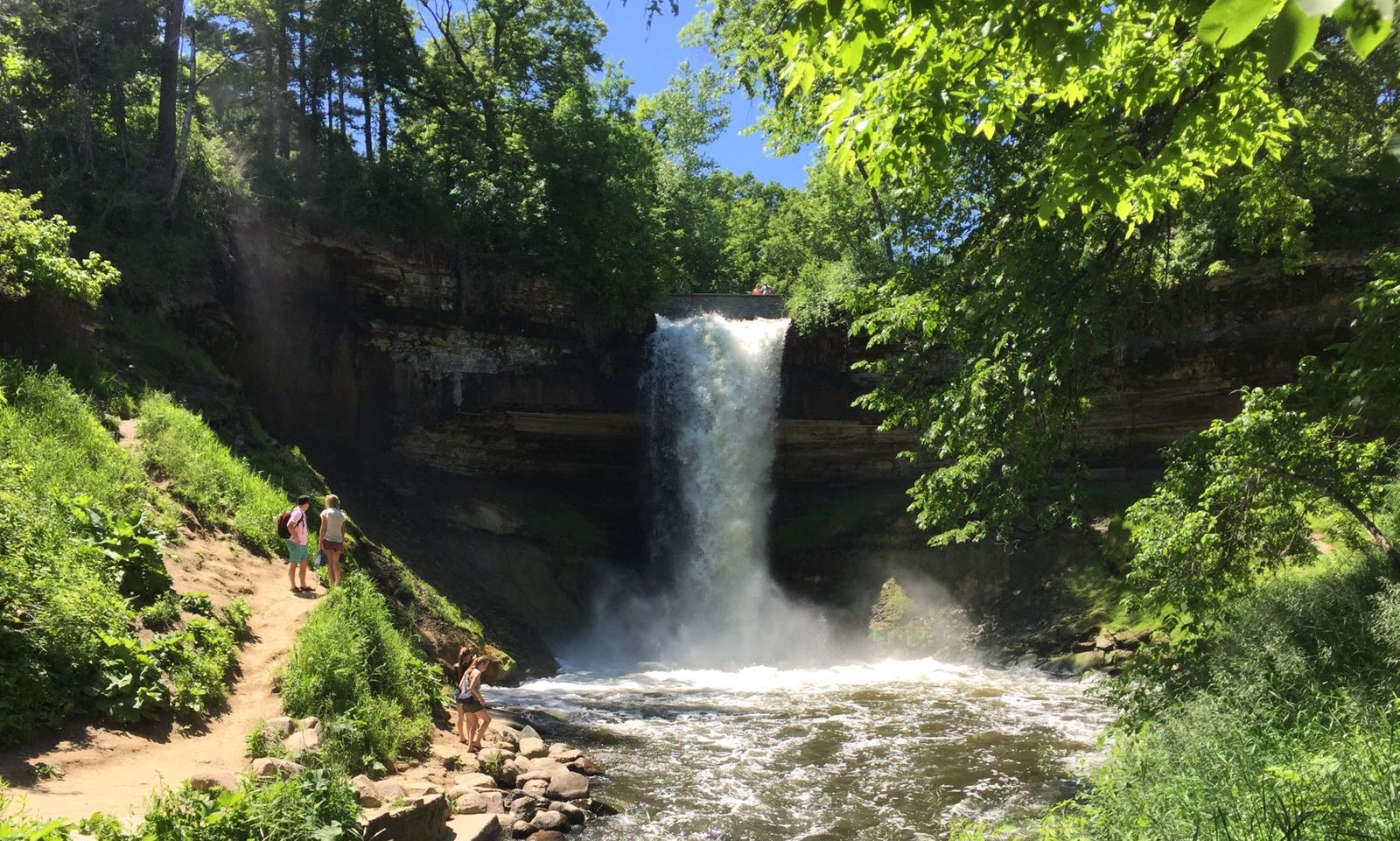
- Minnehaha Falls, June 2017
- Location: Minneapolis, Minnesota, United States
- Coordinates: 44°54′54″N 93°12′36″W
- Area: 170 acres (69 ha)
- Built: 1849
- Architect: H.W.S. Cleveland; Et al.
- Architectural style: Greek Revival, Late Victorian, Georgian
- NRHP reference No.: 69000369
- Added to NRHP: November 25, 1969

Minnehaha Park is a city park in Minneapolis, Minnesota, United States, and home to Minnehaha Falls and the lower reaches of Minnehaha Creek. Officially named Minnehaha Regional Park, it is part of the Minneapolis Park and Recreation Board system and lies within the Mississippi National River and Recreation Area, a unit of the National Park Service. The park was designed by landscape architect Horace W.S. Cleveland in 1883 as part of the Grand Rounds Scenic Byway system, and was part of the popular steamboat Upper Mississippi River "Fashionable Tour" in the 1800s.

The park preserves historic sites that illustrate transportation, pioneering, and architectural themes. Preserved structures include the Minnehaha Princess Station, a Victorian train depot built in the 1870s; the John H. Stevens House, built in 1849 and moved to the park from its original location in 1896, utilizing horses and 10,000 school children; and the Longfellow House, a house built to resemble the Henry Wadsworth Longfellow's house in Cambridge, Massachusetts. The park was listed on the National Register of Historic Places in 1969 as the Minnehaha Historic District in recognition of its state-level significance in architecture, commerce, conservation, literature, transportation, and urban planning.

The central feature of the park, Minnehaha Falls, was a favorite subject of pioneer photographers, beginning with Alexander Hesler's daguerreotype in 1852. Although he never visited the park, Henry Wadsworth Longfellow helped to spread the falls' fame when he wrote his celebrated poem, The Song of Hiawatha. The falls are located on Minnehaha Creek near the creek's confluence with the Mississippi River, near Fort Snelling. The main Minnesota Veterans Home is located on a bluff where the Mississippi and Minnehaha Creek converge. In 2024, an estimated 2.3 million visits were made to the park.

== History ==
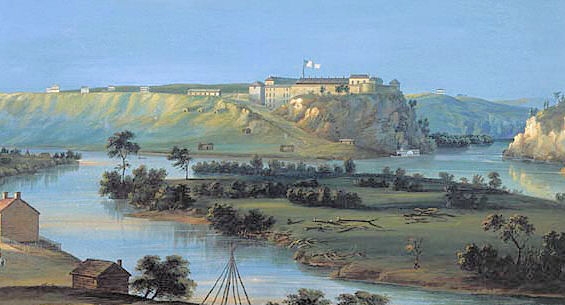
Fort Snelling in 1844, by John Caspar Wild

Minnehaha Falls gets its name from the nearby Dakota people, meaning mni ('water') and ȟaȟa ('curling'). It was considered a safe place for gathering.

European settlement in the area began in 1805 when the US Army bought a nine-square-mile tract of land at the confluence of the Mississippi and Minnesota River from the Dakota people. Sited on the bluff overlooking the rivers, Fort Snelling was built under the command of Colonel Josiah Snelling between 1820 and 1824. In 1821 Snelling's son, William Joseph Snelling came to the fort after leaving West Point and spending a year with friendly Sioux. According to a Minnesota history account written in 1858, "The year after he came to the fort young Snelling set out in company with Joseph R. Brown, a frontiersman and local celebrity, to explore the rivulet that supplies the cascade of Minne Ha-Ha, as far as Lake Minne Tonka." Both "men" were 17-year-old boys at the time.

Some very early records refer to the falls as "Brown's Falls" which lead some historians to assume they were named after prominent pioneer Joseph R. Brown. Park Ranger Kathy Swenson, writing for the National Park Service in 2009 states: "The overwhelming evidence points to Brown's Falls (and creek) being named for Jacob Brown, major general and commander in chief of the army from 1814 to 1828 rather than for Joseph R. Brown, teenage musician at Fort Snelling and later army sergeant (1820–1828), fur trader, politician, editor, and inventor. However, I have not yet found a document that officially or specifically mentions Jacob Brown as the namesake." Swenson explains "'Browns Fall/Creek' seems to be most associated with military maps and personnel while 'Little Falls/Creek' seems to be favored by those without a strong military connection although there are exceptions." The current name is Dakota for waterfall.

=== The Song of Hiawatha brings fame ===
The name "Minnehaha Falls" was in common use by 1855, when the publication of The Song of Hiawatha by Henry Wadsworth Longfellow brought the falls worldwide fame. Longfellow's epic poem features Hiawatha, a Native American hero who falls in love with Minnehaha, a Native American woman who later dies during a severe winter. Longfellow never visited the falls himself. He was inspired by the writings of Mary H. Eastman and Henry Rowe Schoolcraft, and by a daguerreotype created by Alexander Hesler when he chose the name for Hiawatha's lover. The image was taken in 1852, according to a letter written by Hesler, as discussed in "Minnesota History" magazine. Clearly, Longfellow took the name of his character Minnehaha from the falls; the falls were not named for her.

=== The "Fashionable Tour" ===
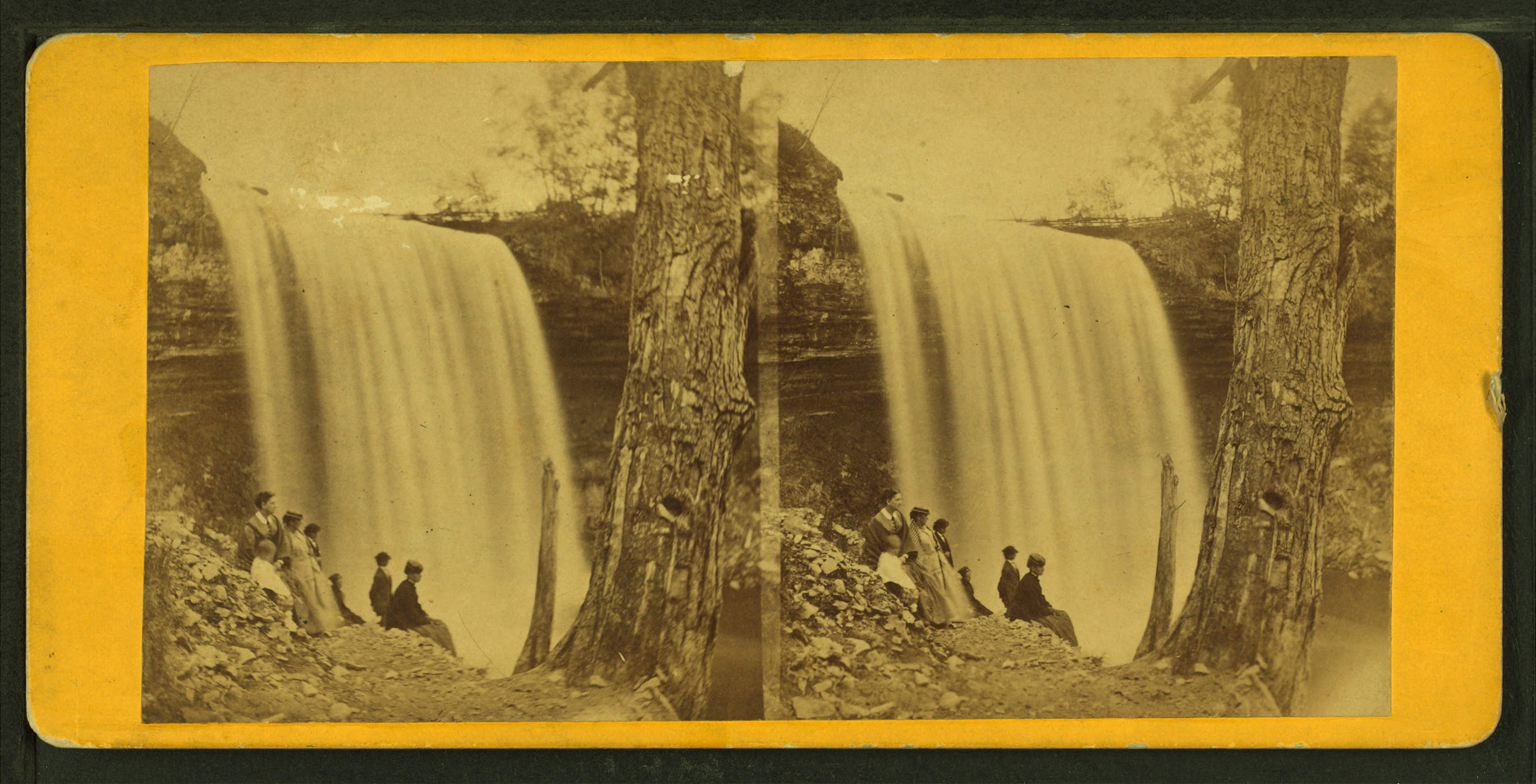
Minne-ha-ha by Benjamin Franklin Upton. This stereoscopic view card is probably one of the photos in Upton's Collection of Photographic Views published in 1865 while he was living in Minneapolis.

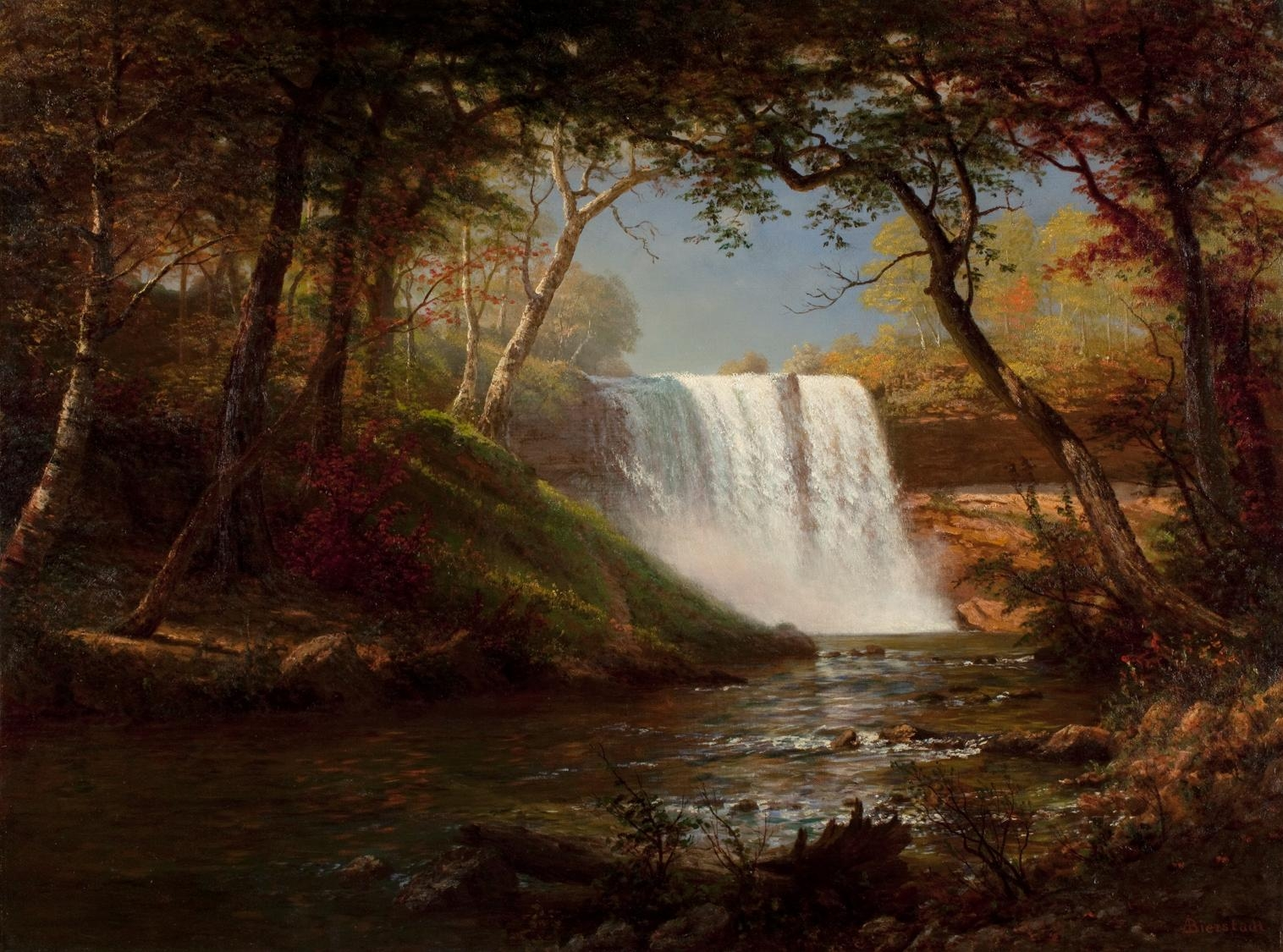
"Minnehaha Falls", oil on canvas, date unknown; artist Albert Bierstadt (1830 - 1902), known for his landscapes of the Westward Expansion, was the foremost painter of these scenes during the 19th century

Beginning in 1828, steamboats began to travel the Mississippi River as far north as St. Paul, the upper limit of commercial navigation on the Mississippi, until two dams and a series of locks were built between 1948 and 1963. The steamboat journey began to attract the attention of tourists, and in 1835 well known artist of American Indian life George Catlin made a trip by steamboat up the Mississippi from St. Louis to the Falls of St. Anthony and Fort Snelling. Impressed with the scenery, Catlin proposed a "Fashionable Tour" of the upper Mississippi, saying:

This Tour would comprehend but a small part of the great "Far West"; but it will furnish to the traveller a fair sample, and being a part of it which is now made so easily accessible to the world, and the only part of it to which ladies can have access, I would recommend to all who have time and inclination to devote to the enjoyment of so splendid a Tour, to wait not, but make it while the subject is new, and capable of producing the greatest degree of pleasure.

Following Catlin's visit, each ensuing year saw an increasing number of sightseers, artists, and photographers. Hundreds of Stereoscopic View cards of the falls exist. The visitors were mainly men but a few women took the journey, most notably 80-year-old Elizabeth Schuyler Hamilton, the widow of Alexander Hamilton. The beauty of the area was also spread through moving panoramas, artistic panoramic creations that were shown much like today's travel documentaries. Quoting from a 1939 paper written by the Minnesota Historical Society:

Crowds of people went to see these travel movies of the 1840s and 1850s and thus toured the great river vicariously. The throngs that wished to view Banvard's panorama were so great when it was displayed in Boston and New York that railroads ran special excursions to accommodate them. In these two cities alone more than four hundred thousand people saw the exhibition. "The river comes to me instead of my going to the river," wrote Longfellow. John Whittier, after seeing a panorama, sang of the "new Canaan of our Israel," and Thoreau, who not only viewed a panorama but also made the tour itself, envisaged "a coming heroic age in which simple and obscure men, the real heroes of history, would build the foundations of new castles [i]n the West and throw bridges across a 'Rhine stream of a different kind.'"

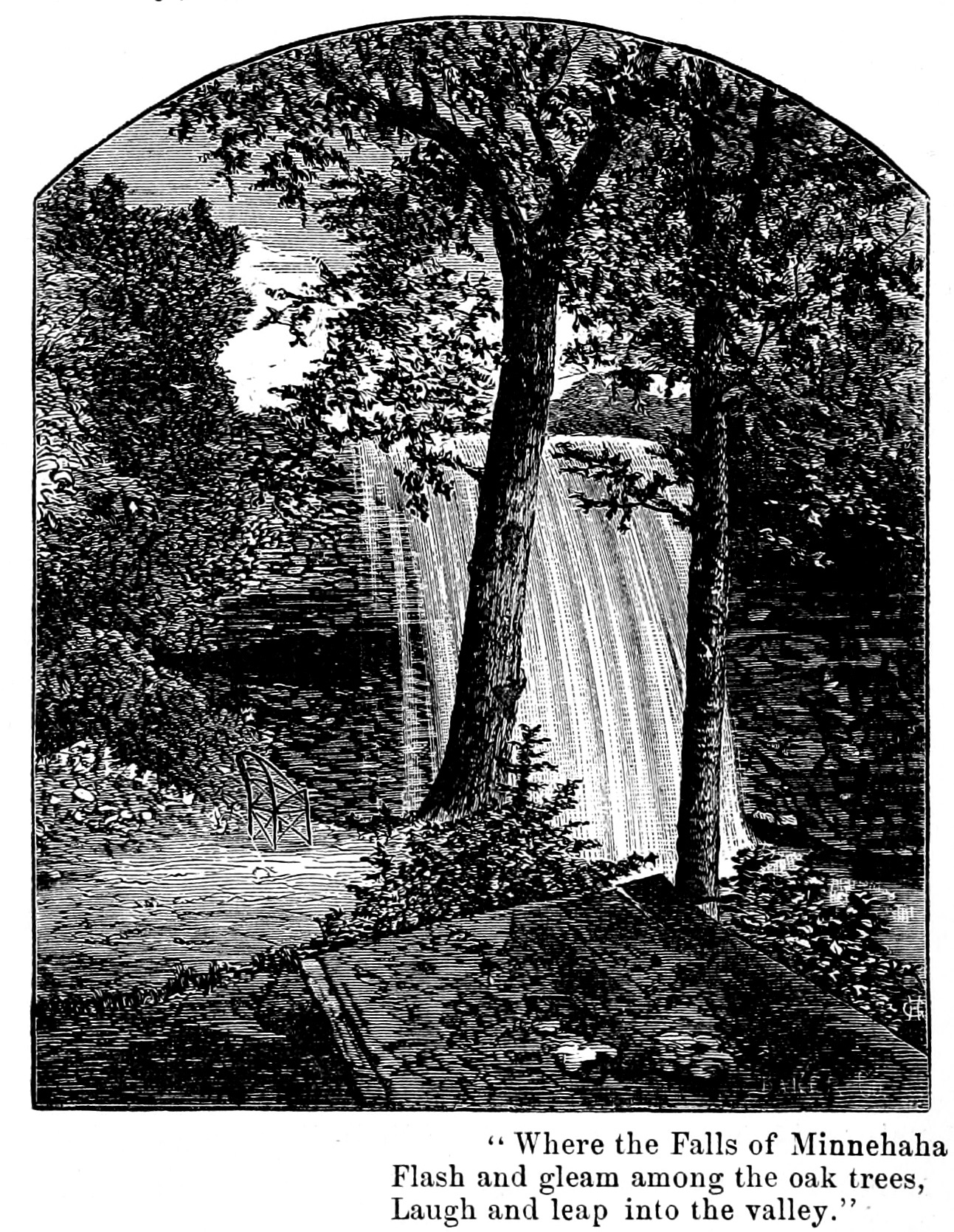
Minnehaha Falls ~ from 1878 Minnesota guide to summer resorts

According to an account written in 1852, passengers disembarked St. Paul and "[from there traveled by] stagecoach for what was called the 'grand tour.' It consisted of a drive from St. Paul to St. Anthony, then out to Lakes Harriet and Calhoun, thence to the Minnehaha Falls and Fort Snelling, and by the Spring Cave [probably "Fountain Cave"] to St. Paul, arriving in time for the visitors, if in haste, to return with the boat down the river."

By the late 1860s the railroads had extended their rails to Minneapolis/St. Paul and they began to actively advertise Minnesota as a tourist destination. The 1878 Chicago, Burlington & Quincy railway promotional booklet, A Guide to the Summer Resorts of Minnesota, told of the delights and health benefits of travel to Minnesota: "The scenery is unequaled and the invigorating air is so rich in oxygen and ozone that it is unsurpassed anywhere in the world and is sure to offer to the tourist and the invalid a hearty welcome, confident that the one will surely find rest and enjoyment, and the other that much coveted of earthly blessings — health." The booklet describes the coach ride from Minneapolis to Minnehaha Falls: "One of the famous trips that few tourists miss taking is that from Minneapolis to St. Paul by carriage. Starting from the former place on the west side of the river, a pleasant drive of four miles over a level prairie, brings the traveler to "Where the Falls of Minnehaha Flash and gleam among the oak trees. Laugh and leap into the valley." The round trip fare from St. Louis to Minneapolis was $30 and it featured Pullman sleeping cars. The booklet lists the population of Minneapolis as 40,000 at that time.

=== Grand Rounds National Scenic Byway ===
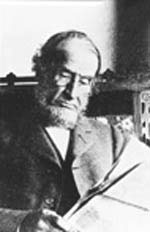
Landscape architect Horace William Shaler Cleveland designed Minnehaha Park in 1883

Fortunately for the generations to come, in 1883 the state legislature created the Minneapolis Board of Park Commissioners. The board began by acquiring park land near today's downtown Minneapolis. Their choice to hire noted landscape architect Horace Cleveland was fortunate. Cleveland was hired by the Board to design a system of parks and interconnected parkways to connect and preserve the existing natural landscape. Cleveland was a preservationist by nature, respecting the natural landscape features and using the existing topography and vegetation to keep his designs as natural as possible. When the park board considered building a photographic stand in the lower glen near the falls in 1889, he responded saying:

I learn that the park commission are seriously thinking of a building at Minnehaha for the express purpose of taking photographs—on the site heretofore profaned by a shanty for that purpose. I cannot remain silent in view of this proposed vandalism which I am sure you cannot sanction—and which I am equally sure will forever be a stigma upon Minneapolis and elicit the anathema of every man of sense and taste who visits the place. If erected it will simply be pandering to the tastes of the army of boobies who think to boost themselves into notoriety by connecting their own stupid features with the representation of one of the most beautiful of God's works.

The result of Cleveland's vision is the famous "Grand Rounds", an interconnected series of parkways and parks centered on the Mississippi River. This vision was expanded by subsequent park commissioners and superintendents to encircle a series of lakes, now known as the "Chain of Lakes", and to follow Minnehaha Creek to Minnehaha Falls. The Grand Rounds was designated as a National Scenic Byway in 1998..

=== Acquisition and development ===
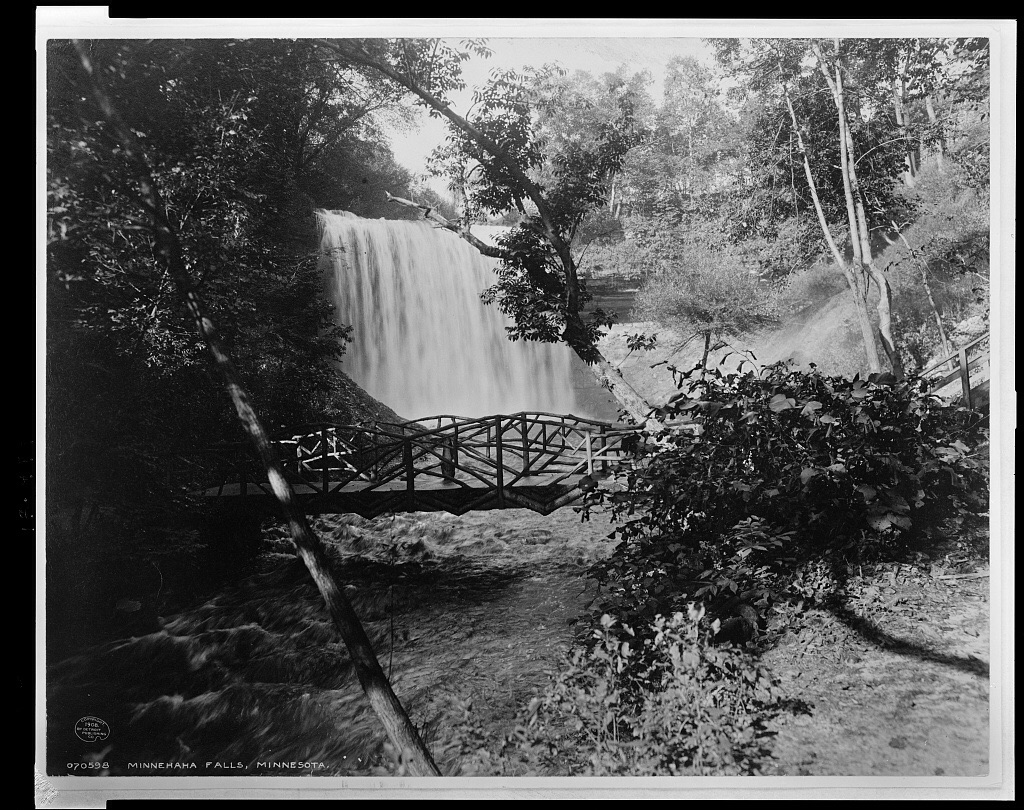
Minnehaha falls with rustic bridge ~ circa 1895

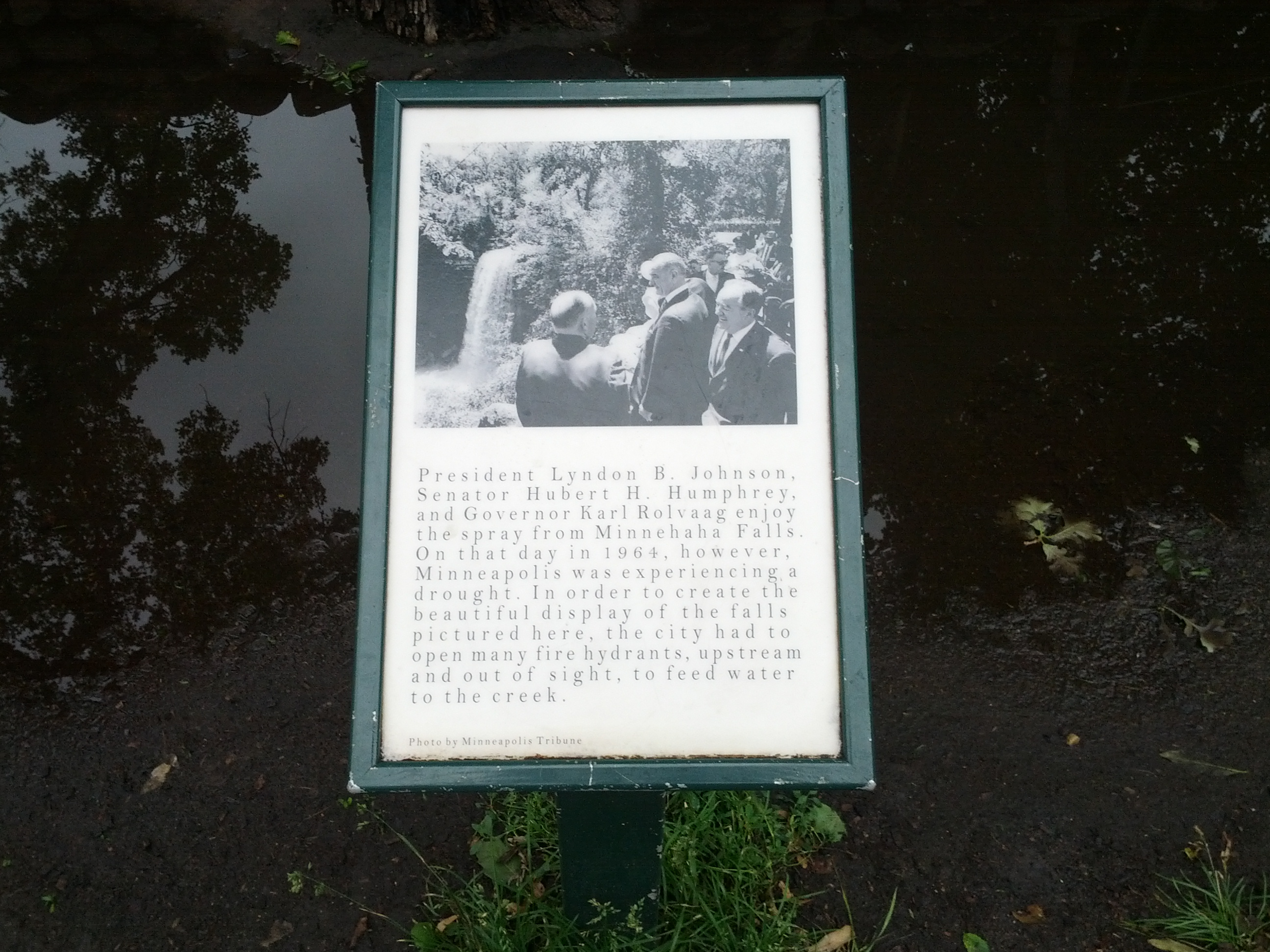
Commemorative plaque with photograph of President Lyndon B. Johnson, Senator Hubert H. Humphrey, and Governor Karl Rolvaag visiting the Falls in 1964

When Minneapolis' Park Board purchased Minnehaha Falls and surrounding land in 1889, it became one of the first state parks in the United States; only New York had created a state park by that time. The next summer the Park Board began to furnish the park with tables, seating, and lavatories. By 1893 a pavilion had been built and the park approved funding for two bridges "of a rustic nature", one above the falls and the other below. A refectory was built in 1905 to serve "refreshments of a clean and wholesome nature at a reasonable cost." In 1926 the park board designated the park to be a center for winter sports activities; plans were made to build a ski jump and the board purchased toboggans for rental. Major improvements including retaining walls, bridges, and stairs were made by federal Works Progress Administration (WPA) crews from 1936 to 1942.

While on the campaign trail in 1964, Lyndon B. Johnson and Minnesota Senator Hubert H. Humphrey visited the park on June 28. Johnson would go on to win the presidential election that year with Humphrey as his running mate. Their visit is commemorated with a plaque which reads:

President Lyndon B. Johnson, Senator Hubert H. Humphrey and Governor Karl Rolvaag enjoy the spray from Minnehaha Falls. On that day, however, Minneapolis was experiencing a drought. In order to create the beautiful spray of the falls pictured here the city had to open many fire hydrants upstream and out of sight, to feed water to the creek.

The park saw conflict in the 1960s when the highway department planned an elevated freeway between Minnehaha Park and Longfellow Gardens over Minnehaha Creek. The park board challenged the plan and brought the case to the U.S. Supreme Court. Fortunately for the park a similar case was decided in favor of the preservation of park land, thus setting a precedent, and the elevated freeway was never built. Eventually a highway was built in the late 1990s that routed the road through a tunnel over the creek and covered by a "land bridge". A new garden, the Longfellow Garden, was established on top of the land bridge.

Major improvements were also made in the 1990s. The Pergola Garden was created to feature native wildflowers and grasses. The parking lot that once overlooked the falls was removed, replaced by a garden and a low circular wall inscribed with Longfellow's words. The old refectory was given a veranda and a bandshell was added. In 2007 a new river overlook was built in the Wabun picnic area and included a children's playground.

In 2011 major restoration work on the park was completed. The crumbling historic retaining walls built by the WPA in the 1930s were reinforced, eroded stream banks were restored, natural seating areas made of limestone were added, and trails and paths were improved. Landscape improvements were also done: invasive plants were removed and replaced with native plantings with deeper roots to stabilize the stream banks and prevent erosion.

By the mid-2010s, more than 850,000 people visited Minnehaha Falls each year, and it continued to be the most photographed site in Minnesota.

In 2020, during the COVID-19 pandemic and in the aftermath of protests over the murder of George Floyd, the park board passed a resolution permitting homeless encampments in city parks on an indefinite basis. Minnehaha Regional Park was one of several sites designated by the park board as capable of hosting an encampment for people experiencing homelessness.

== Description ==
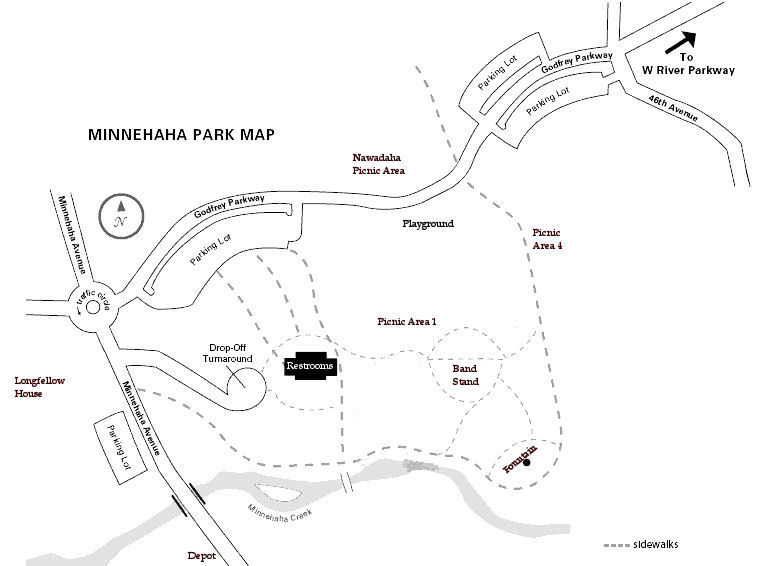
Map of the north end of the park

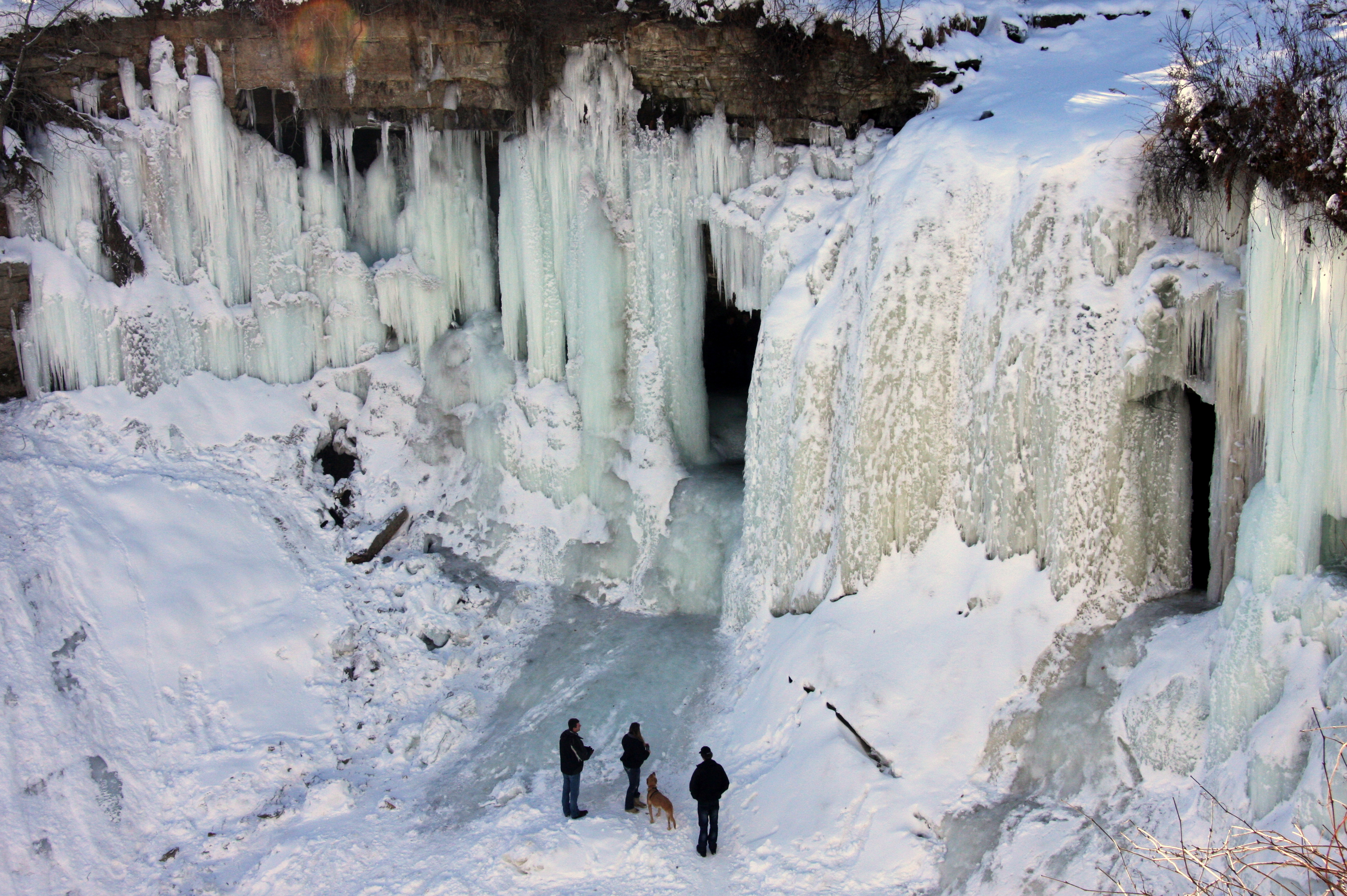
Frozen Minnehaha Falls

Minnehaha Park is situated on the banks of the Mississippi River within the Minnehaha Historic District. Located between Hiawatha Avenue and the Minnehaha Parkway, the park includes Minnehaha Creek with its falls and glen. The 167-acre park is divided into two main portions: an upper section above the falls, with grassy open areas like many other city parks, and the lower 54-acre section which is for the most part allowed to maintain its natural state.The creek runs through the upper section and after it drops at the falls, it flows through the lower glen for another three-fourths of a mile.

Minnehaha Park is a popular site for weddings and cultural festivities. Minnesota is well known for its large population of Swedish immigrants. Since 1934 Swedes have celebrated Svenskarnas Dag (Swedish Heritage Day) at the park in June of each year. The park has a bandstand with free music concerts in the summer. Bicyclists use miles of off-street trails, including the former Milwaukee Road right-of-way, which leads to Fort Snelling State Park. Bikes are available for rent, and there is an off-leash dog park area. Also located within the park are reservable outdoor picnic sites, and picnic shelters for groups, as well as playgrounds and a summer wading pool for children. The falls freeze in the winter, making the park a popular year-round attraction.

At one time the park also featured a zoo and pony rides. In 1893 the Park Board gave permission for a Shetland pony concession and also began to accept gifts of animals for a zoo in the park. The zoo grew in size, and by 1899 a bear pit and an alligator tank had been added. Although very popular, when Theodore Wirth became the new park superintendent in 1906, the zoo was removed at his urging. The animals were donated to Longfellow Gardens, but a fenced area containing deer and elk remained until 1923. To this day the area is sometimes referred to as "the deer pen".

Between the 1930s and the 1950s there was also an "Auto Tourist Camp" where large numbers of tourists tented or stayed in small cabins. A park historian states that in those years "the camp was intended to appeal to the many tourists who were traveling the country in their new automobiles". At one time there were several grist mills located on Minnehaha Creek. The remains of a stone and earth mill dam, built in the lower glen in 1853 or 1854, is still visible beside the creek.

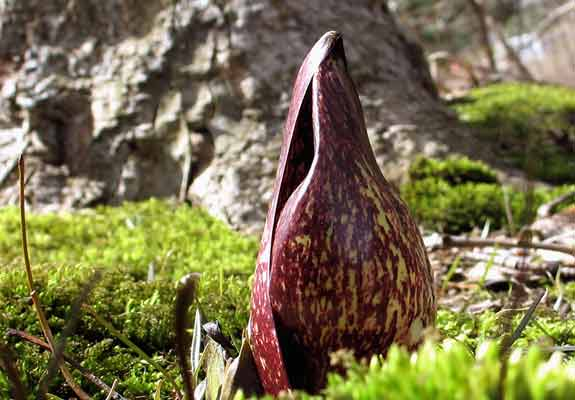
Skunk cabbage

Gardens in the upper park area include Longfellow Gardens, Minnehaha Falls Pergola Garden, and the Song of Hiawatha Garden. The lower glen area offers examples of a surprisingly large number of trees that are native to Minnesota including basswood, black ash, maples, oaks, willows, and cottonwoods. Unusual plants include the first spring-blooming plant, skunk cabbage, often blooming so early that temperatures are still freezing and snow may still be on the ground. As the name implies, they have a disagreeable odor except to the various insects that prefer to feed on rotting flesh or dung. By consuming carbohydrates stored in its fleshy roots, skunk cabbages can maintain a temperature inside the spathe that is 15–35 degrees warmer than the surrounding air temperature. The warmth helps attract cold-blooded, early-emerging pollinating insects during early spring when temperatures are still chilly. As the spathe dies back the large, showy leaves emerge which die back by mid-August, making the plant difficult to find in late summer. Other wild flowers include wild ginger, trout lilies, anemones, marsh marigold and various ferns and sedges. The Minneapolis Park and Recreation Board is working to remove invasive species that have been introduced into the park in order to promote a healthy environment so that native species may survive and grow.

The central feature of the park, Minnehaha Falls, lies several thousand feet upstream from its original mouth where it emptied into the Mississippi River 10,000 years ago at the end of the last Great Ice Age. Erosion below the falls has exposed Minnesota's geologic past from the present day back to over 450 million years ago, when Minnesota was covered with shallow seas.

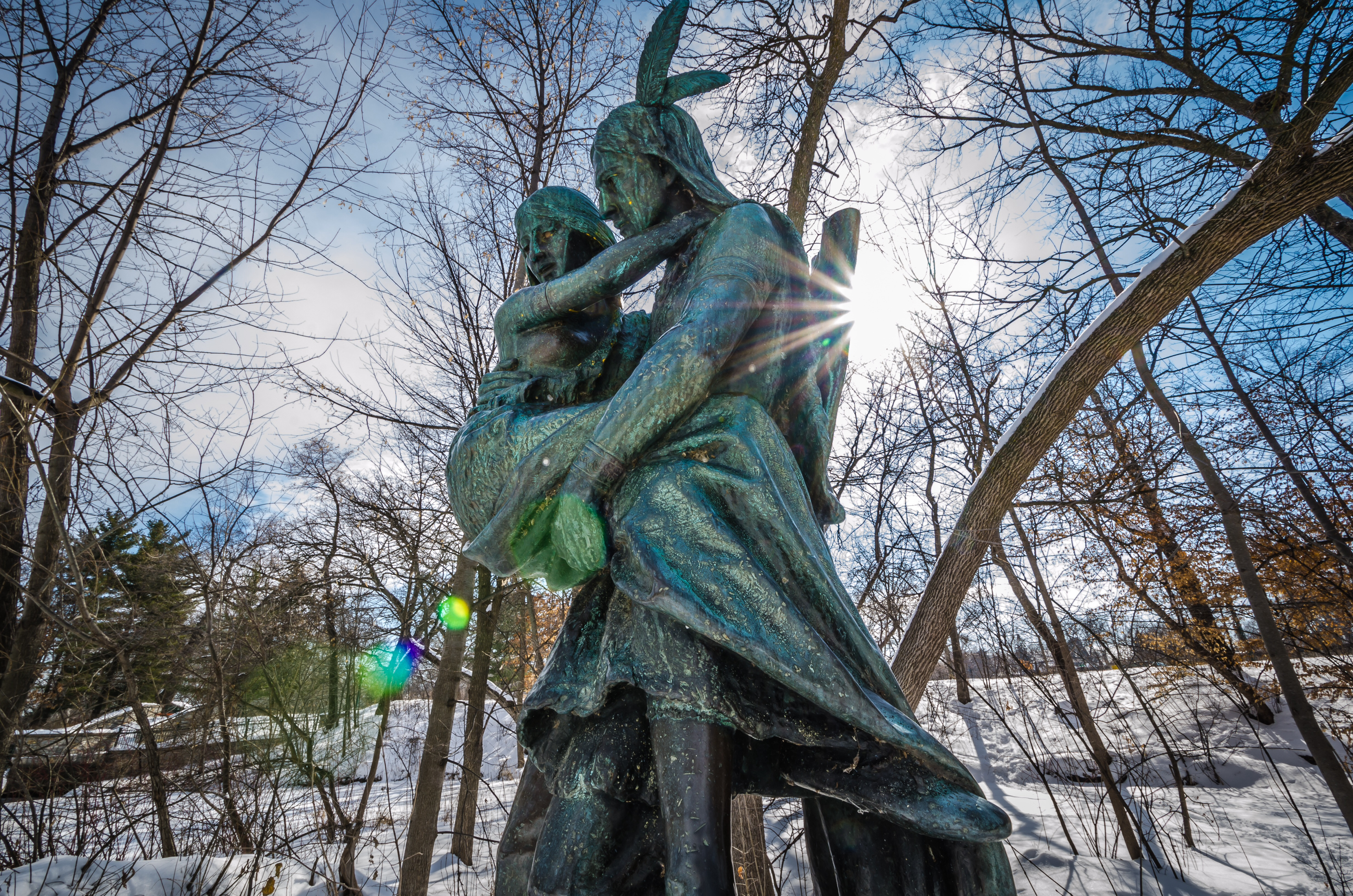
Hiawatha and Minnehaha, 1912 bronze sculpture by Jacob Fjelde

Statues in the park include a bronze sculpture of Hiawatha and Minnehaha, by Jacob Fjelde depicting Hiawatha carrying Minnehaha. It was originally created in plaster for the Columbian Exposition in 1893, and cast in bronze and erected at the park in 1912. Other statues commemorate several notable figures including John H. Stevens, the first authorized resident on the west bank of the Mississippi River in what would become Minneapolis. He was granted permission to occupy the site, then part of the Fort Snelling military reservation, in exchange for providing ferry service to St. Anthony across the river. A statue of Swedish musician and poet Gunnar Wennerberg was placed in the park in 1915. A mask of Dakota leader Taoyateduta (Little Crow) was placed overlooking the falls in 1992.

While the name Minnehaha is often translated as "Laughing Water", the correct translation is "curling water" or "waterfall". The name comes from the Dakota language elements mni, meaning water, and ȟaȟa, meaning waterfall. Thus the expression "Minnehaha Falls" translates as "Waterfall Falls". The "Laughing Water" translation comes from Mary H. Eastman's book Dahcotah – Life and Legends of the Sioux Around Fort Snelling, published in 1849. The Dakota called Minnehaha Creek "Wakpa Cistinna", meaning "Little River". According to information provided by the National Park Service, an early missionary who had learned the Dakota language wrote: "The Indian name, 'Little Waterfall,' is given ... in speaking of the falls now called by white people 'Minnehaha'. The Indians never knew it by the latter name, bestowed upon it by the whites."

=== Minnehaha Creek and Falls ===
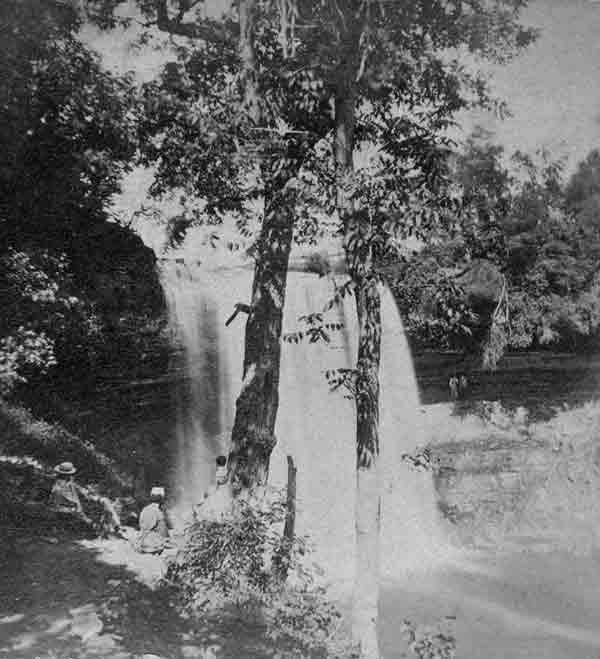
Minnehaha Falls, c. 1860

Minnehaha Creek extends from Lake Minnetonka in the west and flows east for 22 miles (35 km) through several suburbs west of Minneapolis, and continuing through south Minneapolis. The watershed for the creek covers 181 square miles (470 km^{2}). Along the creek is a 53-foot (16-meter) waterfall, Minnehaha Falls, which is situated 3/4 of a mile from where the stream empties into the Mississippi River.

Minnehaha Falls is geologically linked to Saint Anthony Falls, which is the only waterfall on the Mississippi River. Roughly 10,000 years ago St. Anthony Falls was located several miles downstream on the Mississippi River at the confluence of the glacial River Warren (at present-day Ft. Snelling). Geologically, the area has a sandstone layer beneath a layer of limestone. Over the centuries, water in the river beds broke through the limestone layer, and the churning at the bottom of the falls ate away at the soft underlying sandstone. Eventually, the hard limestone cap was unsupported and broke off. Thus St. Anthony Falls receded, moving upstream at a rate of about 4 feet (1.2 m) per year. As St. Anthony Falls on the Mississippi River moved past Minnehaha Creek, a second falls was created, Minnehaha Falls, which also continued to move upstream to its present site in the park.

An island in the Mississippi River near Minnehaha Creek once existed; the receding St. Anthony Falls divided into two as it passed around the island. The falls in the channel farthest from Minnehaha Creek reached the upstream end of the island first, cutting off water to the west channel and resulting in an "abandoned waterfall" at the north end of the channel. The abandoned west channel is now a grassy cul-de-sac known as the "Deer Pen". Locating the abandoned waterfall was made difficult in recent years since the Deer Pen was partially filled with tons of fill dirt from nearby construction projects. Today, the mouth of Minnehaha Creek where it joins the Mississippi River is the lowest surface point in the city of Minneapolis at 686 ft (209 m) above sea level.

Minnehaha Falls video, June 2013, after significant rainfall

Erosion within the last century has resulted in a falls that is fairly narrowly channeled and vigorous, notably after a heavy rain. Photographs of the waterfall from the 19th century show a much wider, curtain like character to the falls. When the creek is dry, the older, much-broader ledge can be observed. If there were sufficient interest and funding, some remedial work could theoretically restore the 19th-century appearance of the falls.

Due to extremely cold winter temperatures, the falls freeze, creating a dramatic cascade of ice that can last well into the spring. If there is a drought, the falls may virtually dry up. During high water conditions, the flow of the creek can be hazardous.

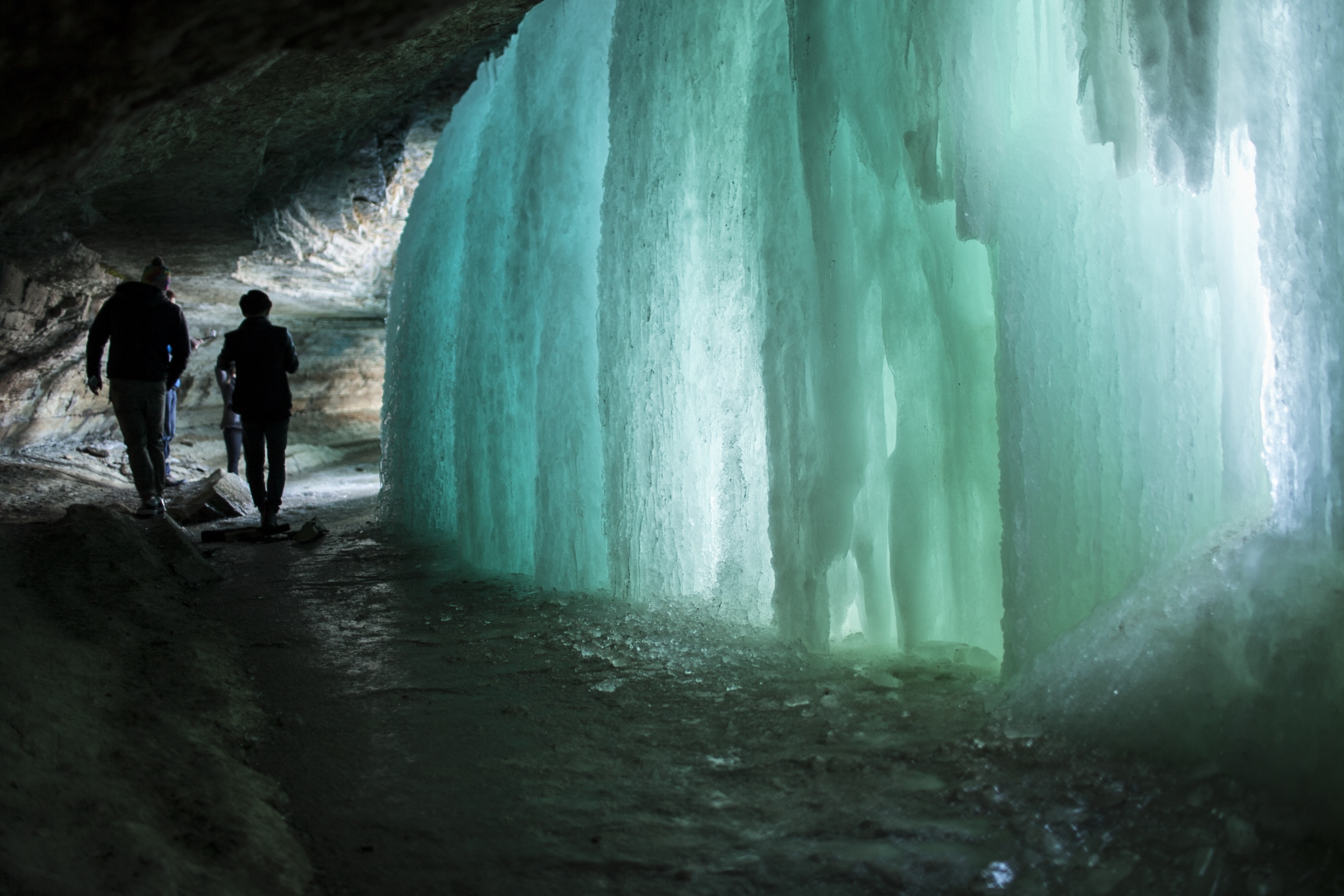
Walking behind frozen Falls

On June 19, 2014, professional kayaker Hunt Jennings descended the waterfall in a kayak when it was at record height due to several days of heavy rain. The only injury sustained by Jennings was a small cut above his upper lip. A spokesperson for the Minneapolis Park and Recreation Board commented, "We are deeply concerned that this act and subsequent publicity will inspire others to attempt the same feat. The impact of the drop, the large boulders at the base of the Falls, the deep water and fast current could easily injure or kill a kayaker."

== Park geology ==
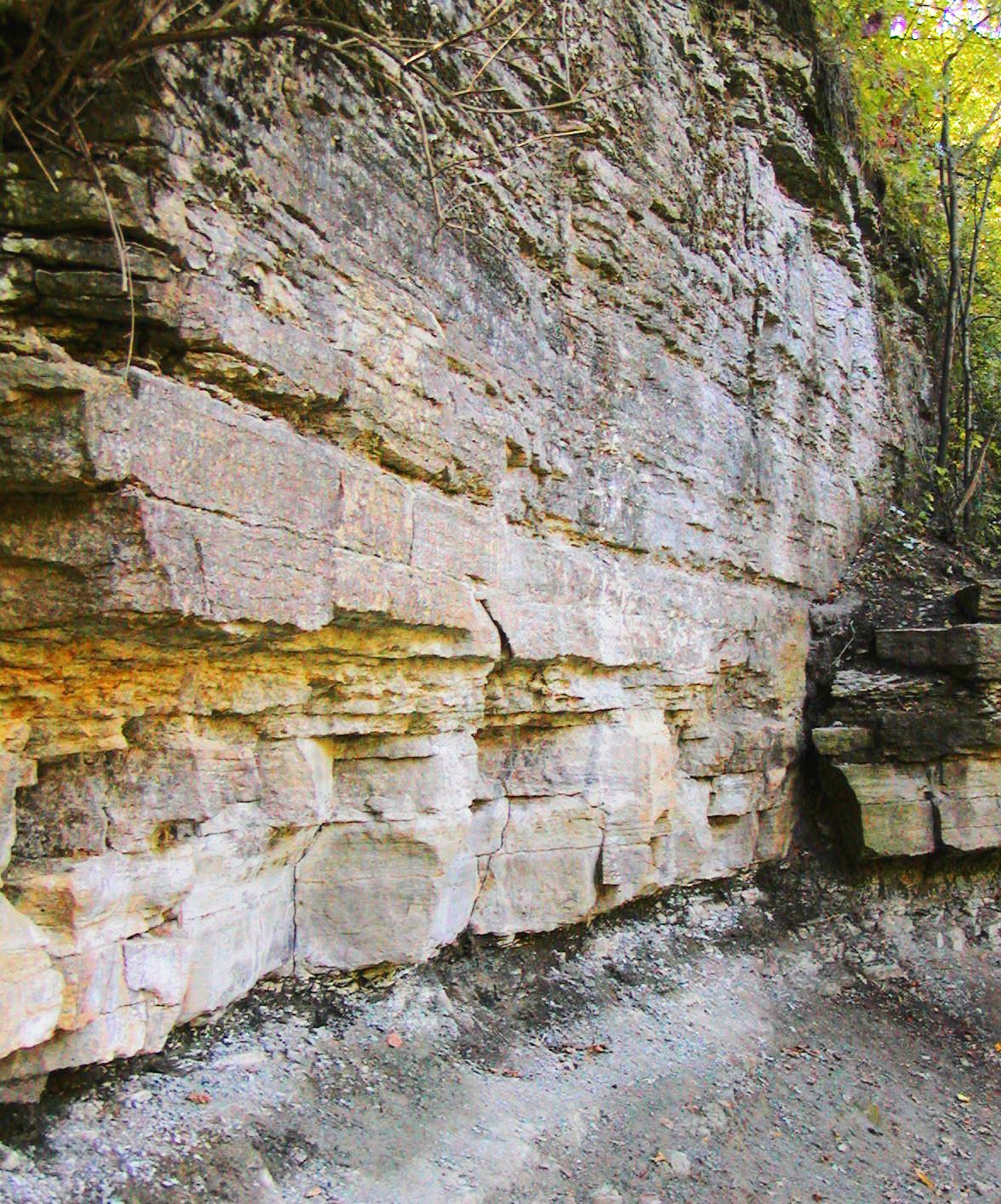
The Platteville Limestone Formation along the banks of Minnehaha Creek. The limestone is the layered unit that constitutes the majority of the photo. Below it is a thin, dark layer of Glenwood Shale. Below the shale is a stripe of St. Peter Sandstone, followed by a slope of eroded sandstone.

Visitors to the park can view the ancient geological history of Minnesota as they walk the path leading from the falls down to the Mississippi River. The uppermost layer of soils and gravels of Minnesota were deposited by the most recent Ice Age, about 10,000 years ago. Four great ice ages have swept away all traces of the more recent Mesozoic and Cenozoic eras in the Twin Cities area, however standing at the upper falls, one is standing directly on the Platteville Limestone Formation laid down during the Ordovician Period of the Paleozoic Era. During the Ordovician Period, about 450 million years ago, the North American continent was situated along the equator and a warm shallow sea covered much of Minnesota. Sea life was abundant and a large number of marine fossils including corals, bryozoans, brachiopods, clams, snails, cephalopods, and trilobites can be found in the limestone and shale sediments at several areas in the Twin Cities and along the Mississippi River in the park.

Descending to the base of the falls one passes through the layered Platteville Limestone Formation and a thin layer of Glenwood Shale. At the base of the falls one enters the level of the Saint Peter Sandstone Formation of pure white quartz sandstone. The Minnesota St. Peter Sandstone is "famous the world over as the example of a well-rounded, well-sorted, pure quartz sand. It is the Ivory Snow of sediments, because it is close to 99.44% pure". This sand was first deposited as beach sand, probably eroded from earlier Cambrian sandstones, along the shores of the Ordovician sea.

At places in the park, especially closer to the Mississippi River, one can see the Glenwood Shale Formation. This thin layer of grey-green rock was probably deposited in deeper-water offshore from the beaches, and now has been exposed by erosion. Together, the three formations that are visible as one walks from the falls to the river represent a sequence of sea-level rise which occurred during the Ordovician period.

A fourth geological layer that lies above the Platteville limestone, Decorah shale, can also be found in the park. The Decorah shale formation is so packed with fossils that it has been called "fossil hash". It has been washed away directly at the falls area but can be found above the Plattville limestone in the exposed river bank below Fort Snelling.

== Historical buildings ==
=== Minnehaha Depot ===
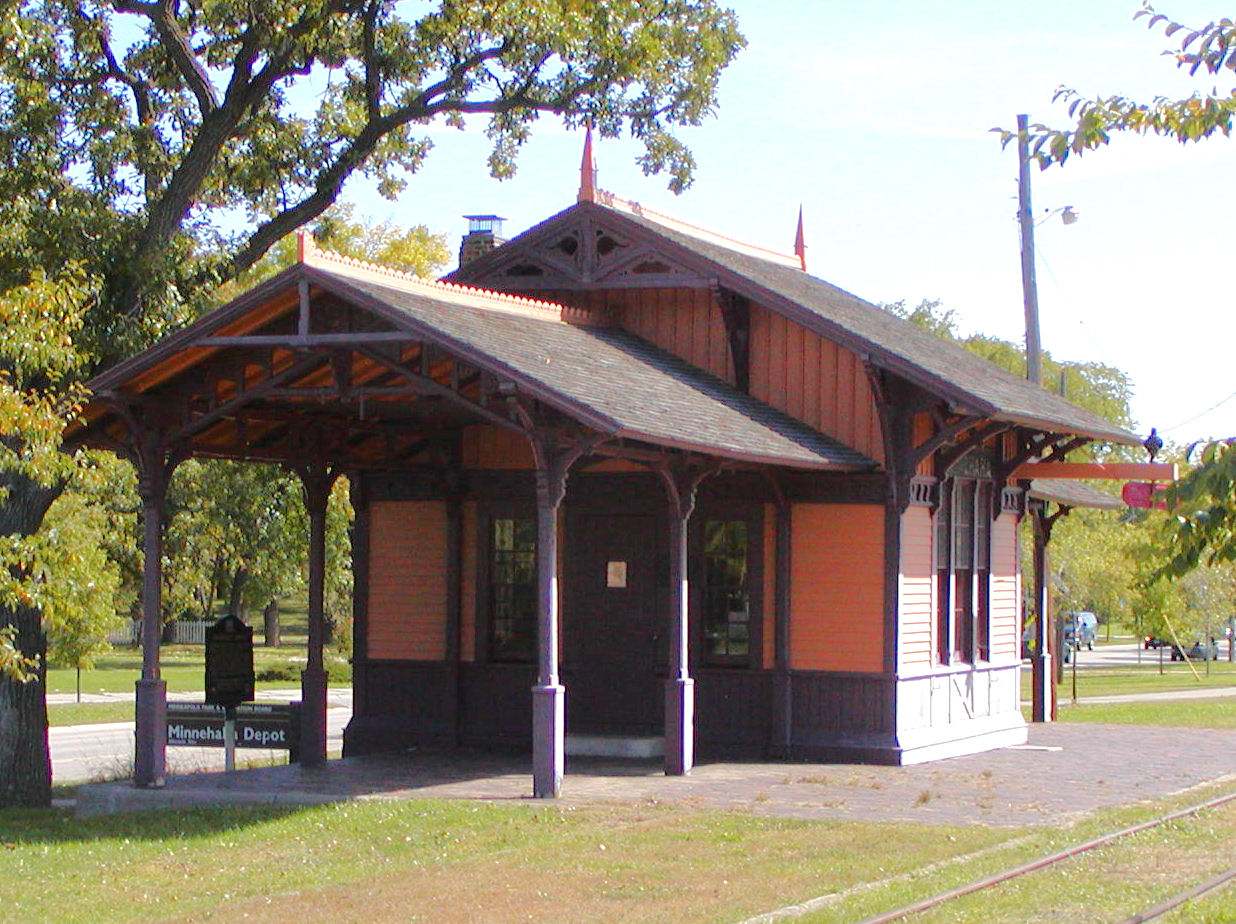
The Princess Depot

A small train station officially named Minnehaha Depot and also known as "the Princess Depot" was built around 1875; it was a stop on the Milwaukee Road railroad and provided easy access to the park from Fort Snelling and Minneapolis. The depot handled as many as 39 round trips per day. The interior is complete and well-preserved, containing an iron heating stove, waiting room benches and a ticket window. In 1964, the title was transferred to the Minnesota Historical Society. The Minnesota Transportation Museum assisted in the restoration of the building, and today provides historic interpretation. The depot is open in the summer on Sundays from 1:30 to 4:30. The 50th Street / Minnehaha Park light rail station of the METRO Blue Line currently serves the park.

=== Longfellow House ===
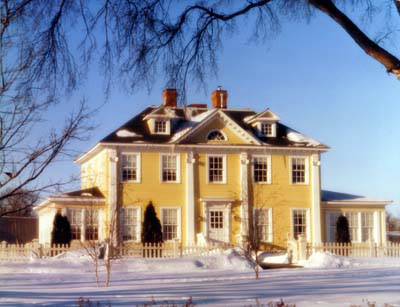
Longfellow House

Despite its name, the Longfellow House was never home to the American poet Henry Wadsworth Longfellow; it was instead the home of Robert F. Jones, a Minneapolis philanthropist and entrepreneur. Built in 1907, the house's facade was designed to resemble Longfellow's home in Cambridge, Massachusetts. Originally the home was part of Jones' private 4.6-acre botanical garden and zoological park near Minnehaha Falls. After Jones died, the home fell into disrepair. His will gave the property to the city which used the house as part of the Minneapolis public library from 1936 to 1967. The house was moved in 1994 and renovated. It opened as an information center in 2001. Today the home serves as the home of a botanical art school and provides offices for the Minneapolis Parks Foundation. The Longfellow House and John H. Stevens House also co-sponsor 90-minute historic nature walks around the park.

=== John Harrington Stevens House ===
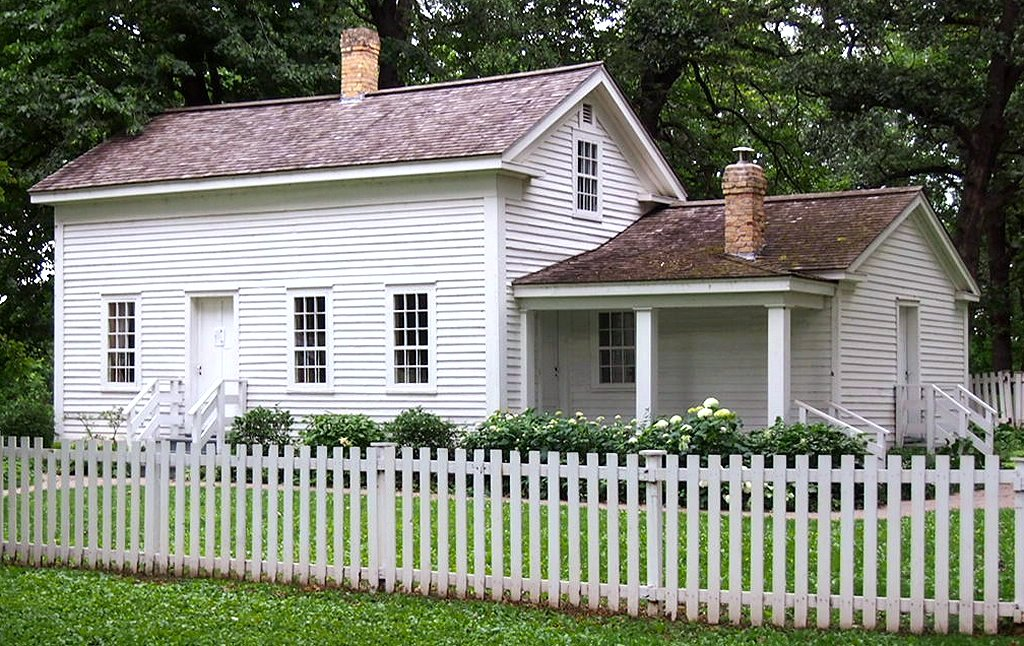
John H. Stevens' House

The John Harrington Stevens House, built in 1849 or 1850 near St. Anthony Falls (on the site where the Minneapolis Post Office now sits), was moved to Minnehaha Park in 1896. According to the Minneapolis Park and Recreation Board, the home has the distinction of being the first wood-frame dwelling built west of the Mississippi. John H. Stevens was granted permission to build his house on land controlled by Fort Snelling in exchange for providing ferry service across the Mississippi River. In subsequent years it became a hub of civic and social activity. Dubbed the "Birthplace of Minneapolis", both Hennepin County and Minneapolis were organized in Stevens' home; it was in this home that the name Minneapolis was suggested.

In 1896 over 10,000 school children helped pull the house to its present location in Minnehaha Park. The children were divided into seven relay teams, each consisting of around 1,000 pupils. As teams finished their designated distance, they dropped the ropes and boarded trolley cars for the park. All went well until "the lads from the South Side High School" refused to give up the ropes to the next relay team. The Minneapolis Tribune reported the event:

At this point there was something of unexpected interest. Waving their school flag in triumph from the gable window of the old building the lads from the South Side High School shouted their school yell and BAD DEFIANCE TO ALL COMERS. At this point the Central High School scholars were billed to relieve the South Siders, and consequently surrounded the building. The spirit of school rivalry broke out, strong and bitter. The South Siders refused to surrender the fortress and flaunted their banner from the window in spite of all entreaties and orders. Contractor Pratt could not oust them. Supt. Jordan could not oust them, and finally Sergeant Martinson called for a detail of police and made a rush for the house. But the South Side lads were still game, and did not give up until several had been made to feel the force of police authority. Then they made a break. As they dashed from one door the Centrals entered by the other, and their banner was soon flying from the gable amid vociferous cheers. The South Siders were chased up the street by a detachment of Centrals, and for a moment it looked as if the rush would result in some bruised heads. However, good nature was restored and again the house started on its way.

The house arrived in the park at 3 pm along with the last relay team of children, having covered a distance of four miles. In the evening, 1,000 Japanese lanterns were placed about the park and the festivities included fireworks and an illumination of the falls. The Tribune newspaper reported that some people complained about the children having a day out of school and "...the park commissioners and the park policemen objected to the way in which the children took possession of the park and everything in it. There was no such thing as controlling them, and they ran over everything in sight. It would have taken a small regiment of policemen to have kept that throng in check."

The house was heavily damaged by three acts of arson in 2022 and required extensive renovations to repair walls, ceilings, and voids.

== Image gallery ==
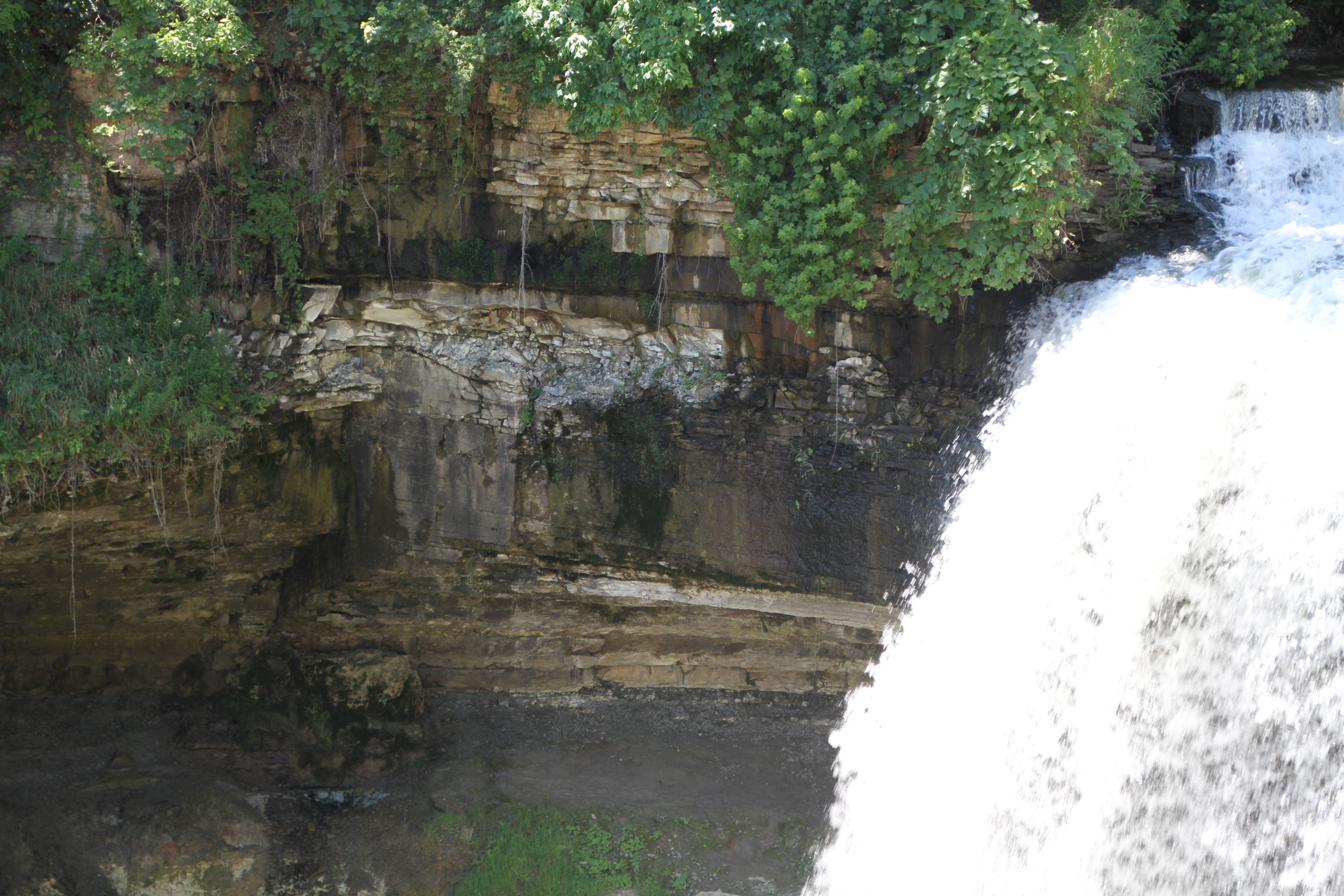
Geology of the falls (Platteville limestone)

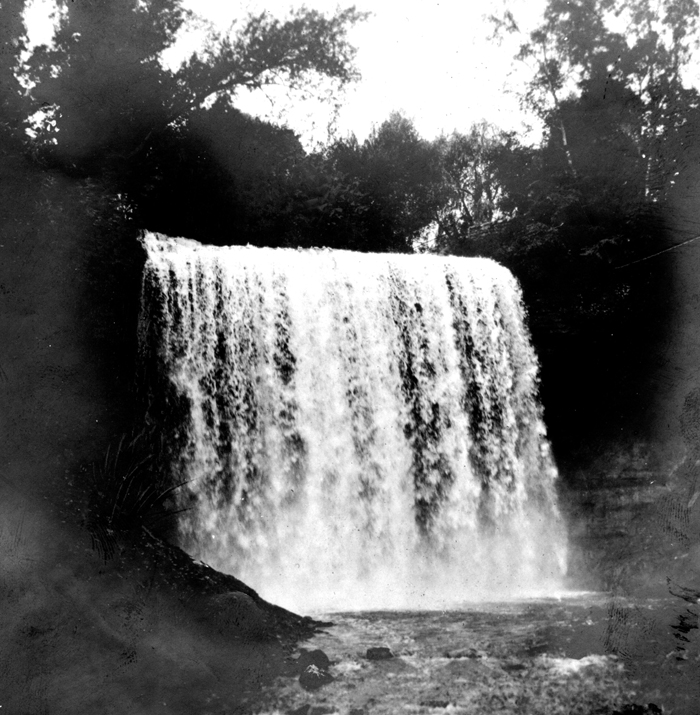
Minnehaha Falls ~ 1914

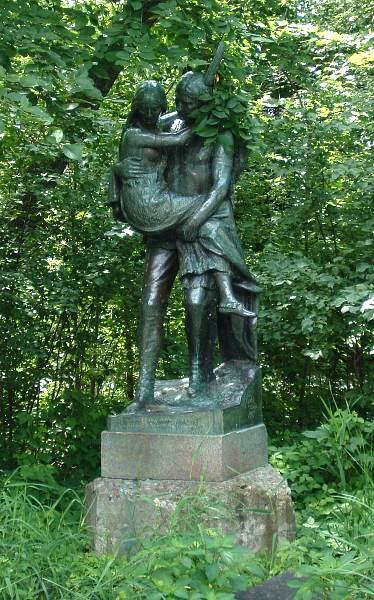
Hiawatha and Minnehaha sculpture by Jacob Fjelde

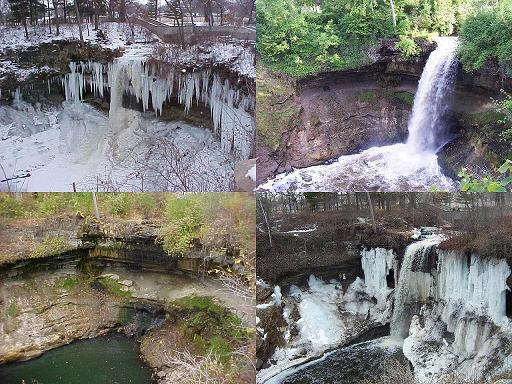
Seasons of Minnehaha

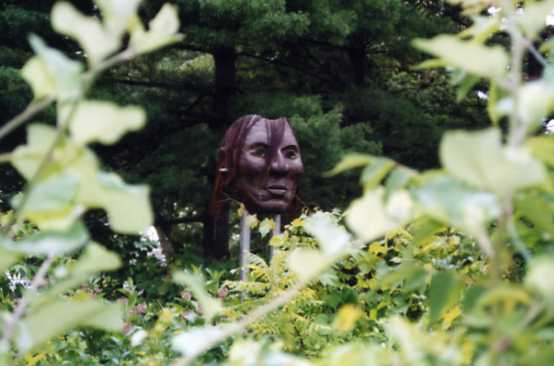
Taoyateduta, known as Chief Little Crow

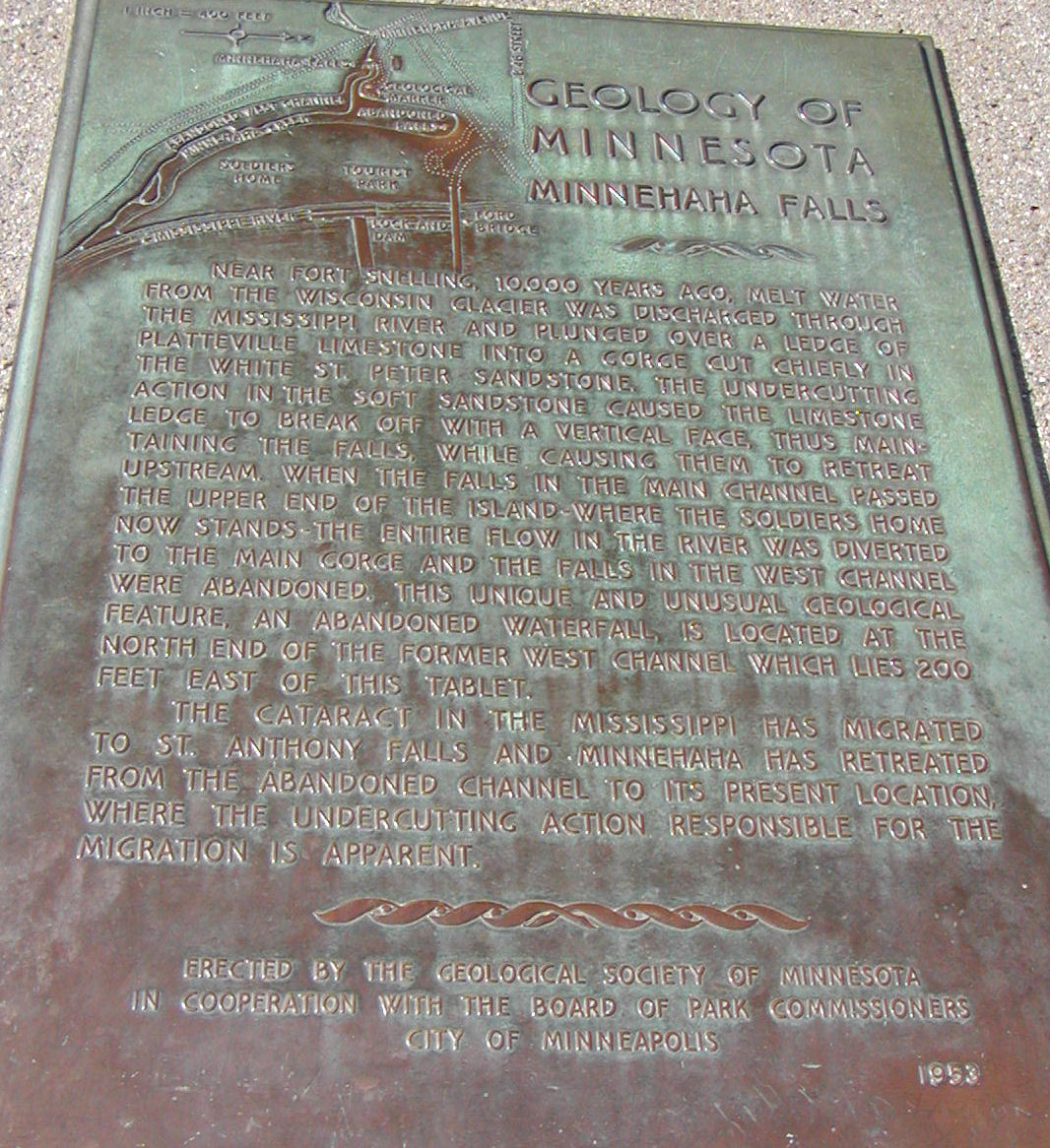
Plaque describing geology of Minnehaha Falls

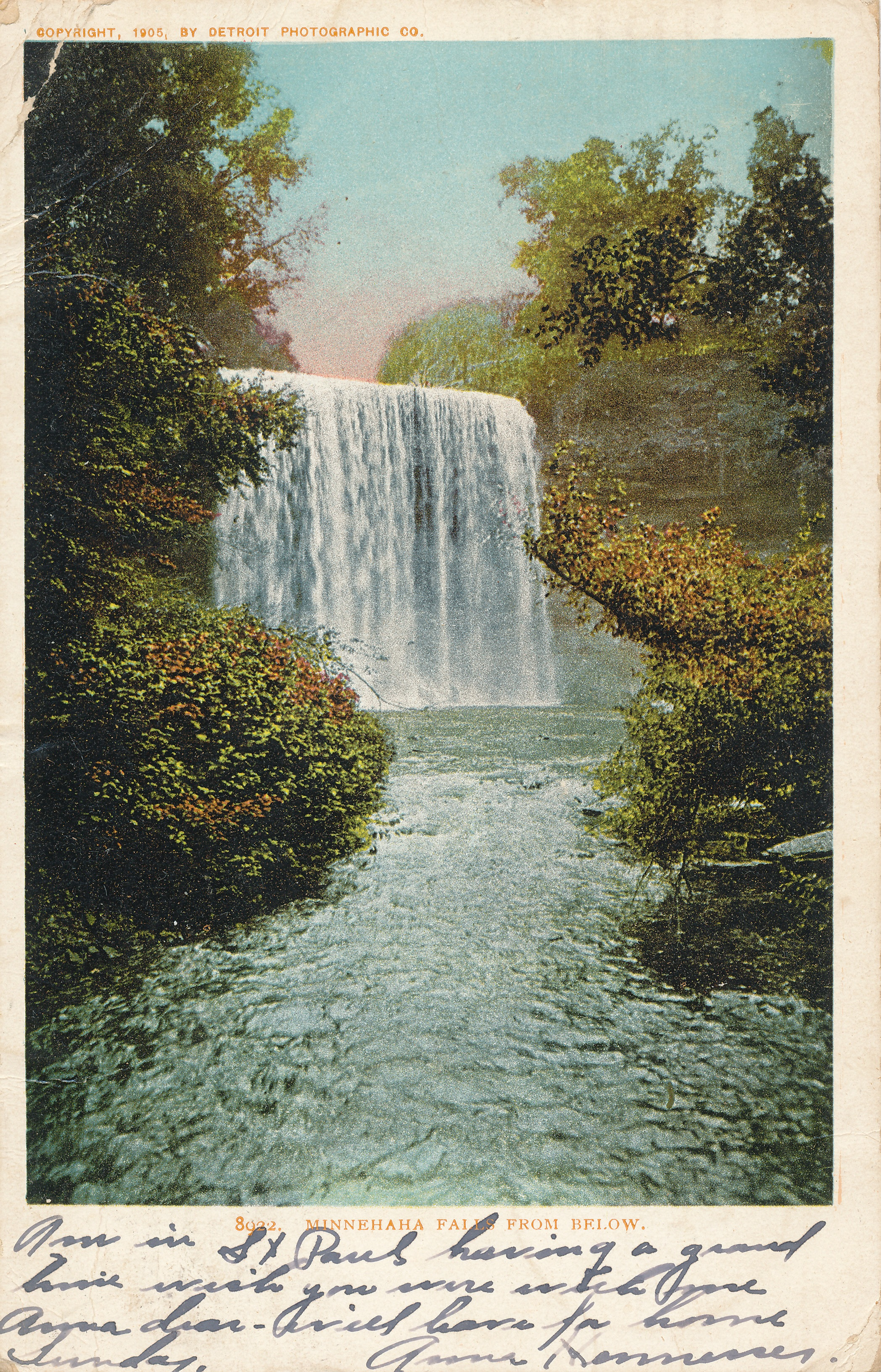
Minnehaha Falls, 1905 post card

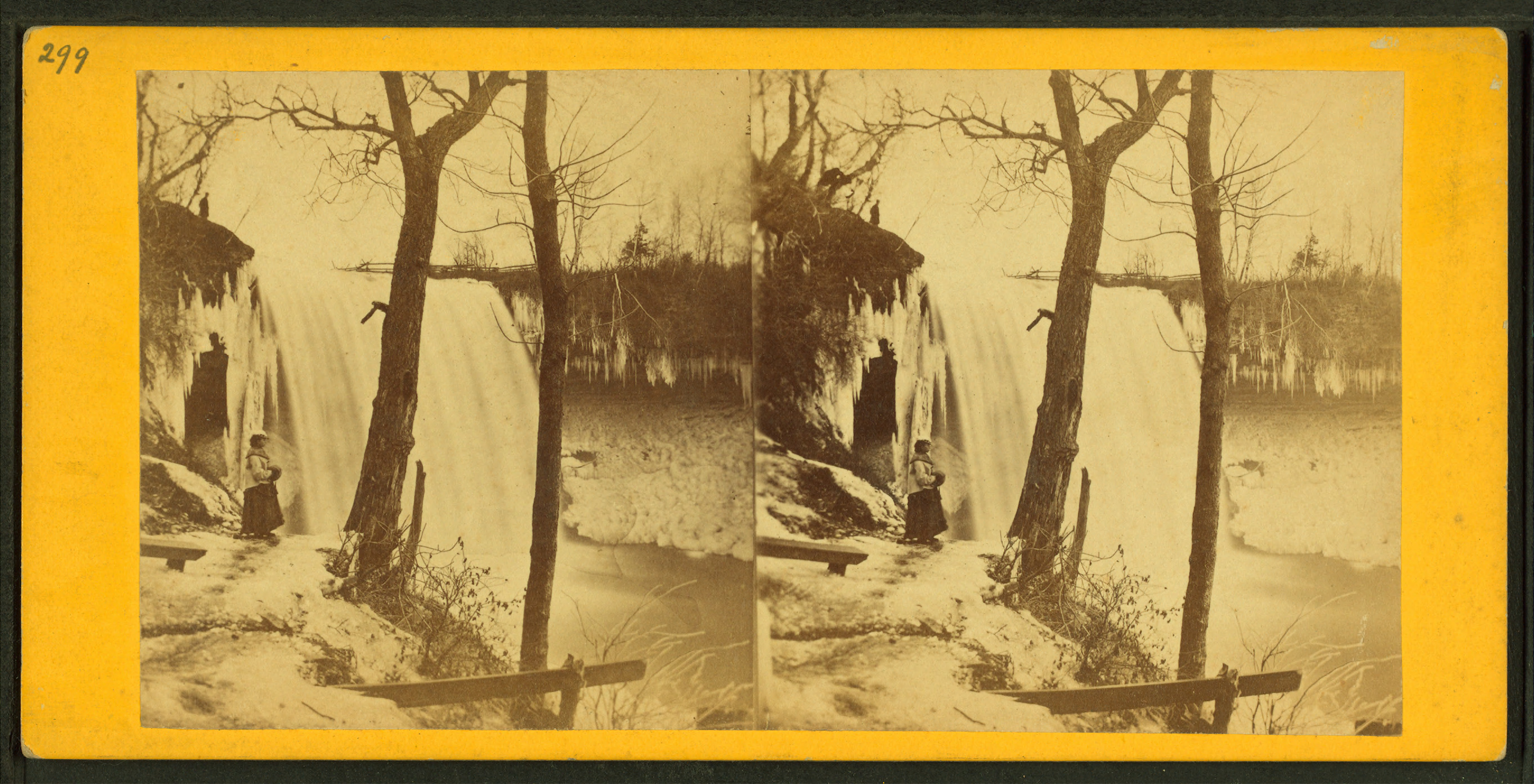
Stereoscopic View of the Falls in winter

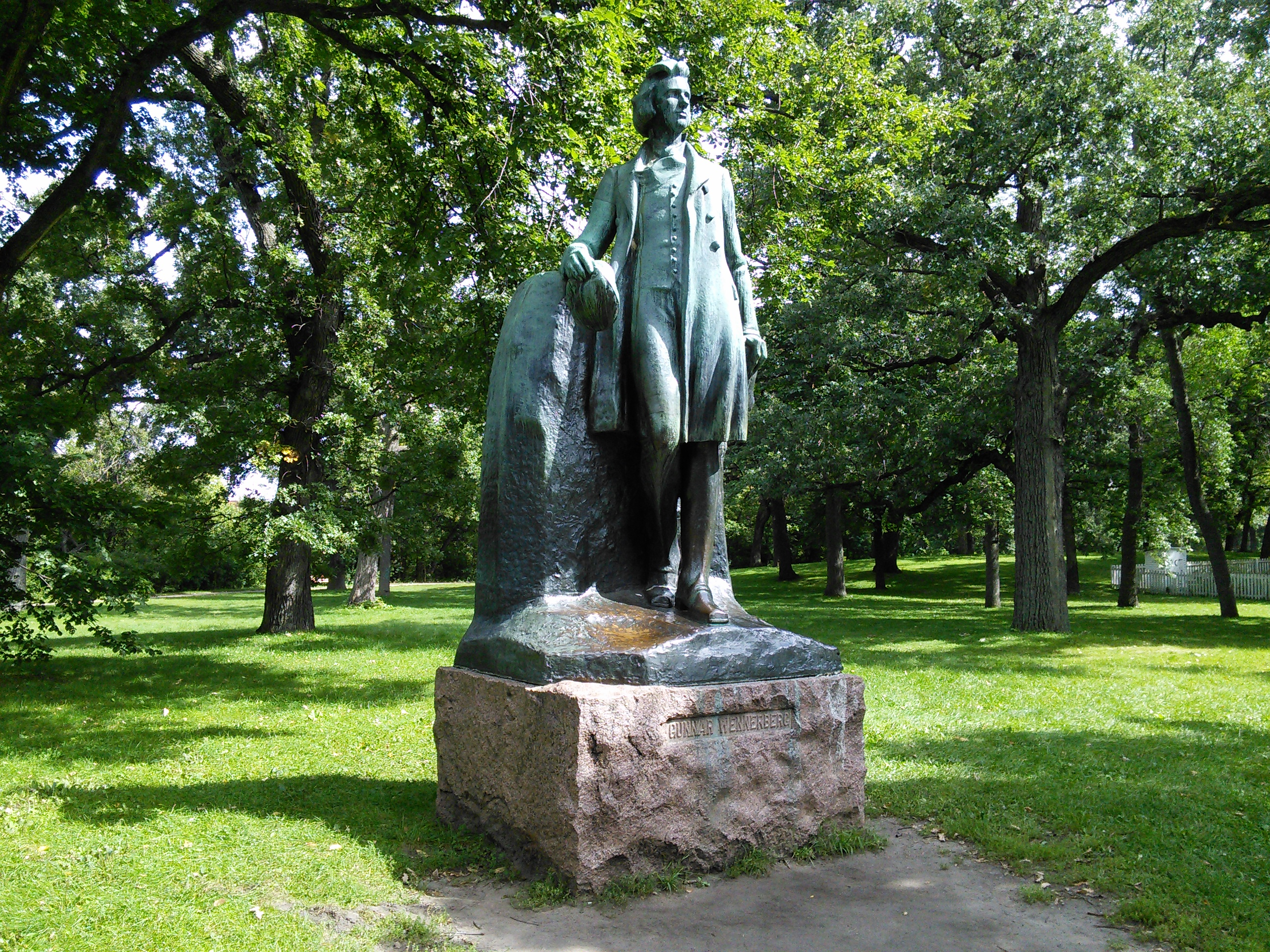
Gunnar Wennerberg statue by Carl Eldh

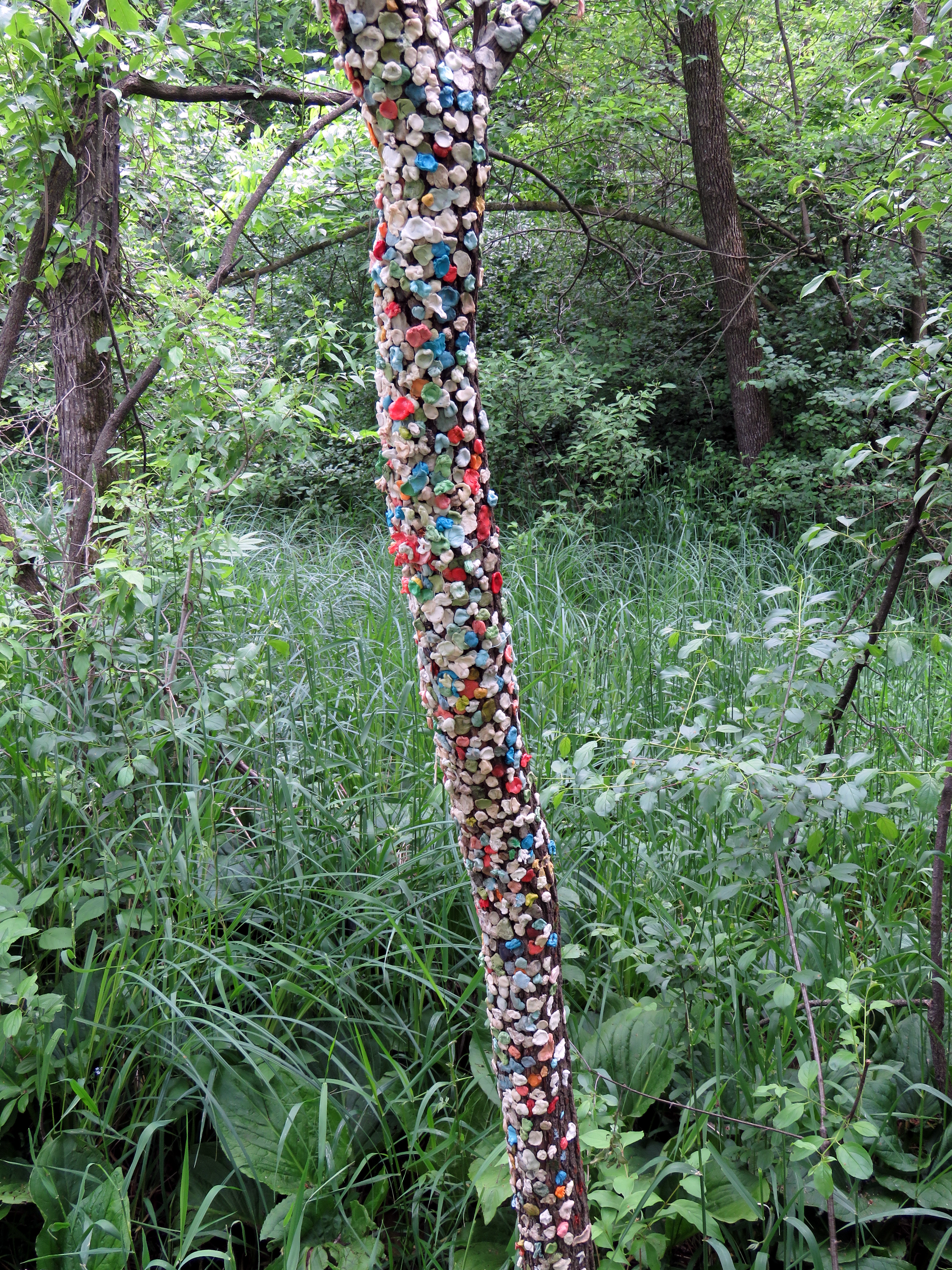
A tree within the park which has been 'decorated' with a large quantity of used chewing gum.

== See also ==
- Coldwater Spring
- List of waterfalls
- Lock and Dam No. 1
- Minnehaha Falls Lower Glen Trail
- Minnehaha Trail
- Winchell Trail
- River Warren Falls
