= Jacob Fjelde =

American sculptor

Jakob Fjelde
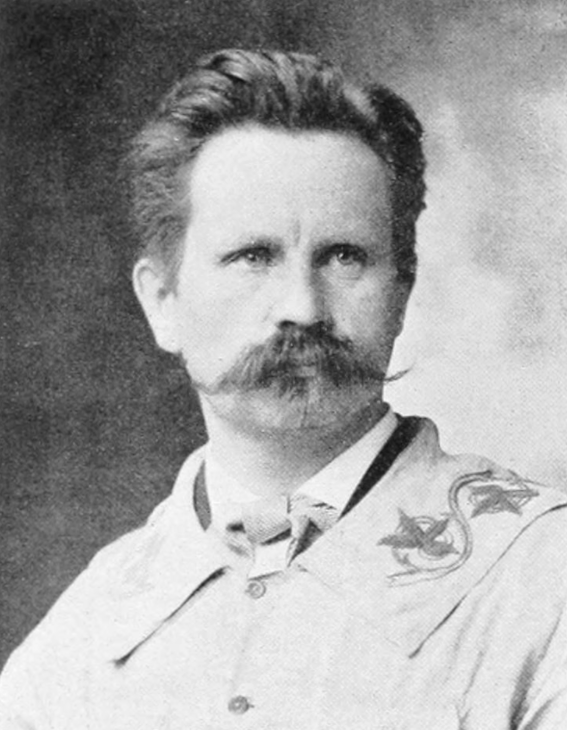
- Born: Jakob Henrik Gerhard Fjelde; April 10, 1859; Ålesund, Norway
- Died: May 5, 1896 (aged 37); Minneapolis, Minnesota, U.S.
- Resting place: Lakewood Cemetery
- Occupation: sculptor
- Children: Paul Fjelde
- Relatives: Pauline Fjelde (sister)

Jakob Henrik Gerhard Fjelde (April 10, 1859 – May 5, 1896) was a Norwegian-born American sculptor. He is remembered as both a prolific portraitist and the creator of public monuments. One of his better known works is the one dedicated to the 1st Minnesota Infantry (1897) located at Gettysburg Battlefield where its 262 members suffered 215 casualties.

== Background ==
Jakob Henrik Gerhard Fjelde was born at Ålesund in Møre og Romsdal, Norway. His father, Paul Gerhard Michelet Fjelde (1827–1873), was a skilled carpenter and wood carver. He had moved to the United States in 1872, but died the following year. Jakob Fjelde was a pupil of Brynjulf Bergslien during 1878. He studied at the Academy of Fine Arts in Copenhagen from 1879 to 1881 and was a student of Vilhelm Bissen 1880–1882.

He traveled abroad, living in Rome from 1882 to 1884. Fjelde lived and worked to Bergen, Norway from 1884 until 1887 when he immigrated to the United States. After arriving in America he settled in Minneapolis, Minnesota. The following year he married the Danish-born Margrethe Madsen. They eventually had four children. He was the father of sculptor Paul Fjelde and the brother of artist Pauline Fjelde. His grandsons included Ibsen scholar Rolf G. Fjelde.

== Career ==
At the Industrial Exposition in Minneapolis during 1889 and 1890, Fjelde presented 18 busts and relief portraits, including marble busts of Sven Oftedal and Georg Sverdrup, both of whom would serve as Presidents of Augsburg College and were founders of the Lutheran Free Church . At the World's Columbian Exposition in Chicago during 1893, he presented a bust of the Norwegian-American politician Knute Nelson.

Jakob Fjelde had first sculpted Henrik Ibsen from life in Molde, Norway during 1885. Although Ibsen disliked sitting for artists, he took a liking to the precocious young sculptor, then 26 years old, and patiently sat for the bust.

== Death and legacy ==
Fjelde died in Minneapolis on May 5, 1896. He was buried in Lakewood Cemetery.

The Minneapolis-St. Paul area hosts several of his major public bronze outdoor monuments. One is Hiawatha and Minnehaha, a statue of Hiawatha carrying Minnehaha based on characters from Henry Wadsworth Longfellow's 1855 poem The Song of Hiawatha. The statue was created for the Columbian Exposition in 1893 and permanently erected in 1912. Another, in Loring Park in Minneapolis, is of Norwegian violin virtuoso Ole Bull was cast in 1897, a year after Fjelde's death. The Minerva bronze sculpture is located in the downtown Minneapolis Central Library.

Among his portraits of Ibsen, several are noteworthy. One is located in Tacoma, Washington in Wright Park, another is at the North Dakota State College of Science in Wahpeton, North Dakota. Another bust of Ibsen, located in the Como Park, Zoo, and Conservatory in St. Paul, Minnesota was stolen from the Park in 1981. The sculpture was recovered, restored, and reinstalled by Public Art Saint Paul in 1999.

== Gallery ==
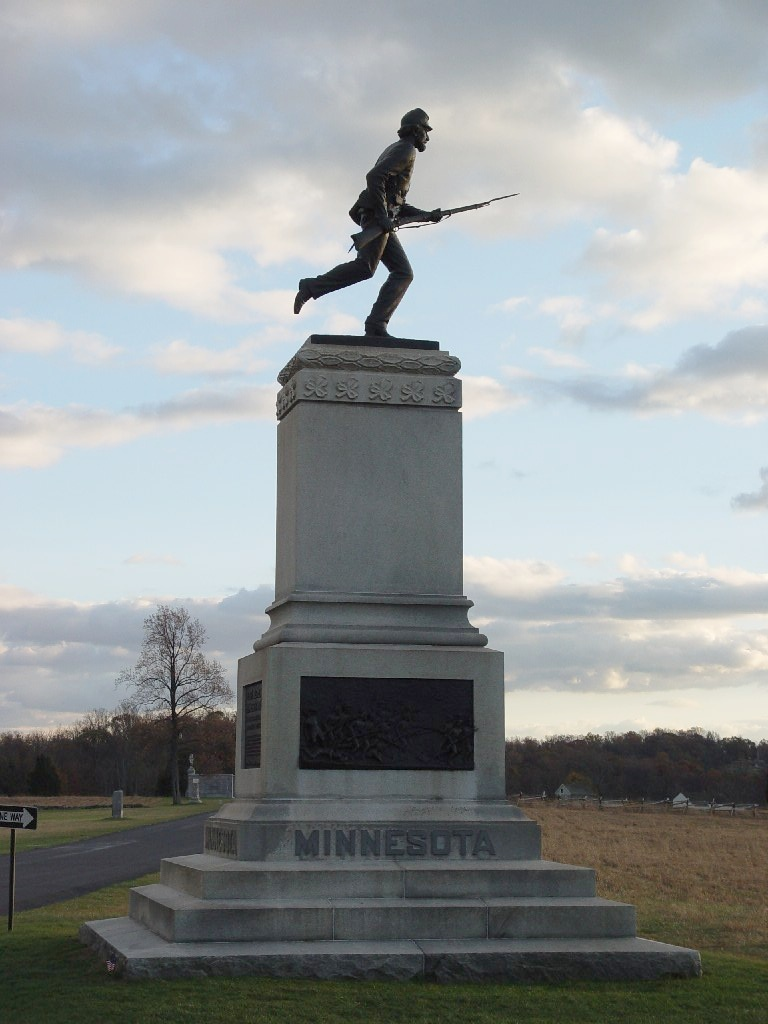
1st Minnesota Infantry Monument at Gettysburg National Battlefield

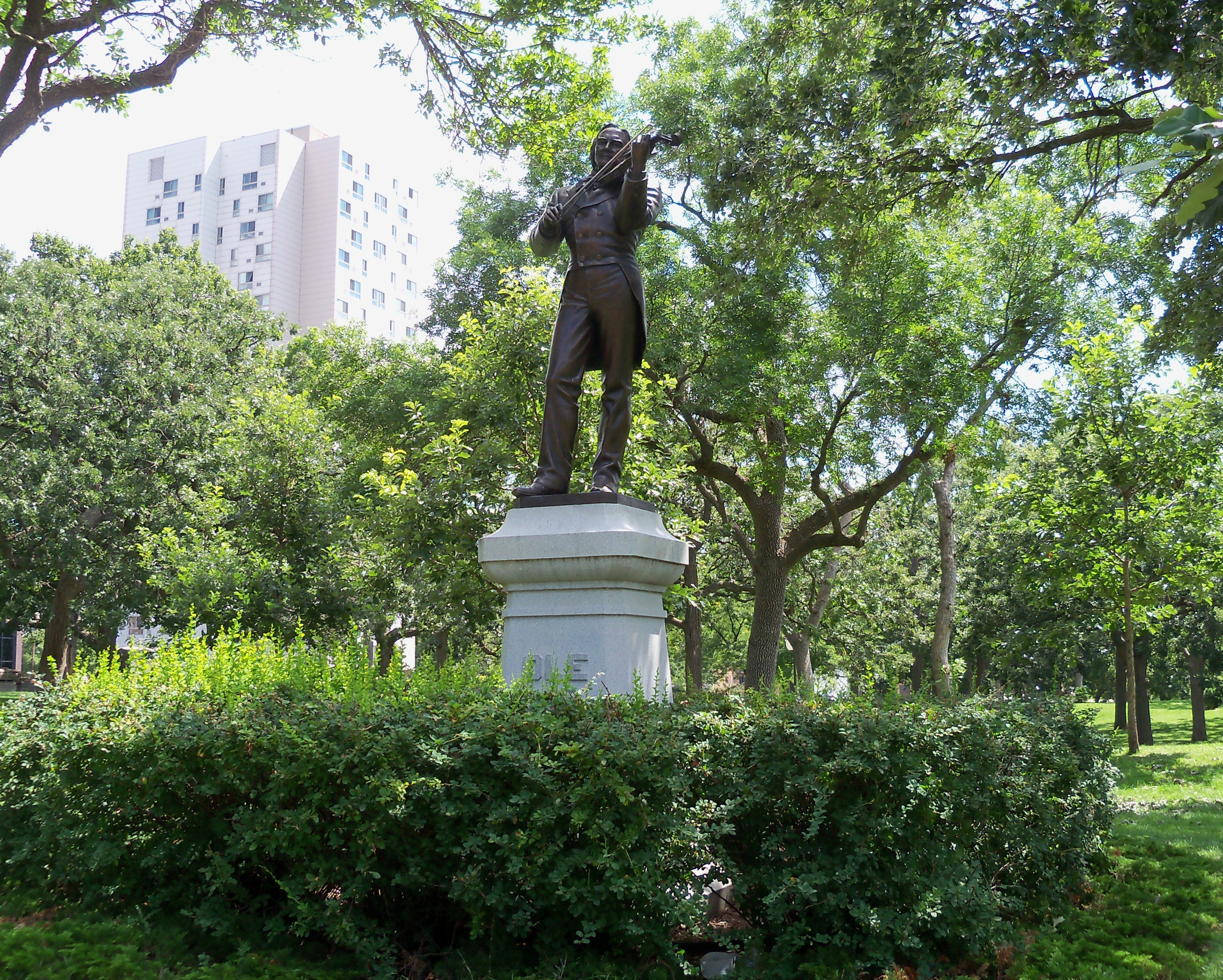
Ole Bull statue at Loring Park

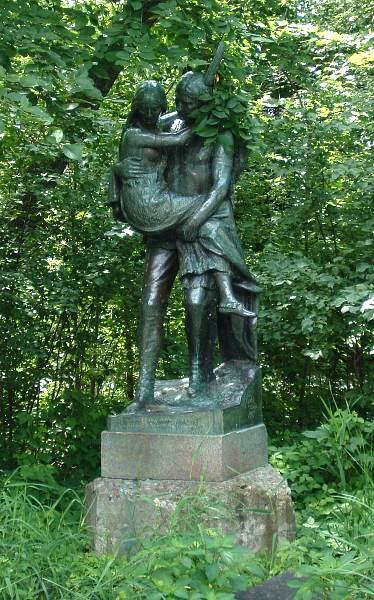
Hiawatha and Minnehaha, 1912 statue at Minnehaha Park

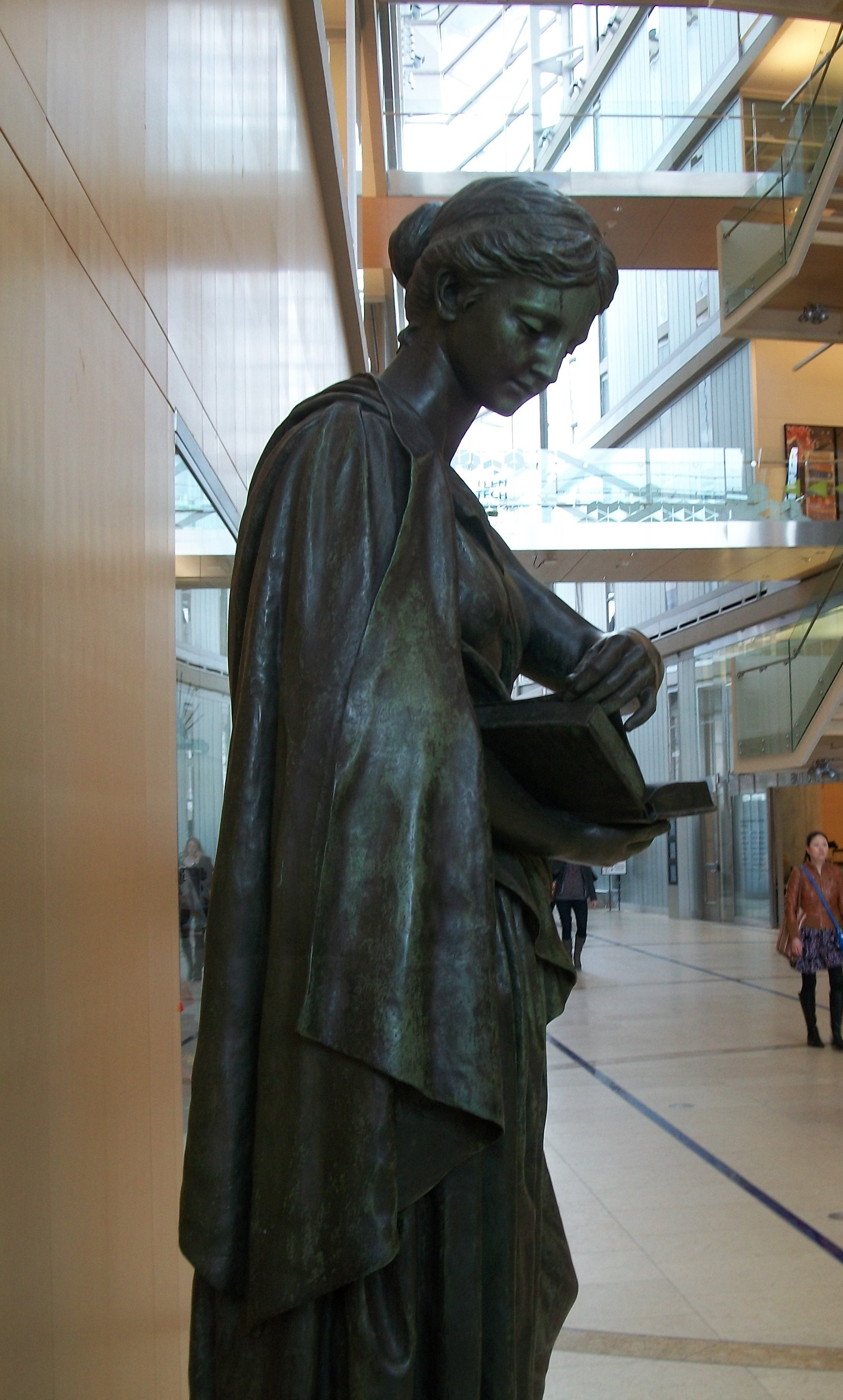
1889 bronze sculpture of Minerva in Minneapolis Central Library atrium

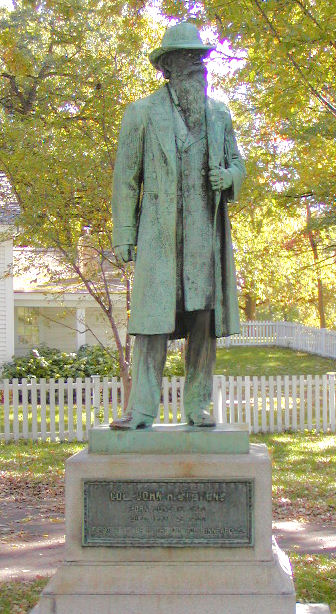
John H. Stevens statue at Minnehaha Park. Sculptor Johannes Gelert worked from drawings made by Fjelde.
