= Minnehaha Park (Spokane, Washington) =

City park in Spokane, Washington, United States

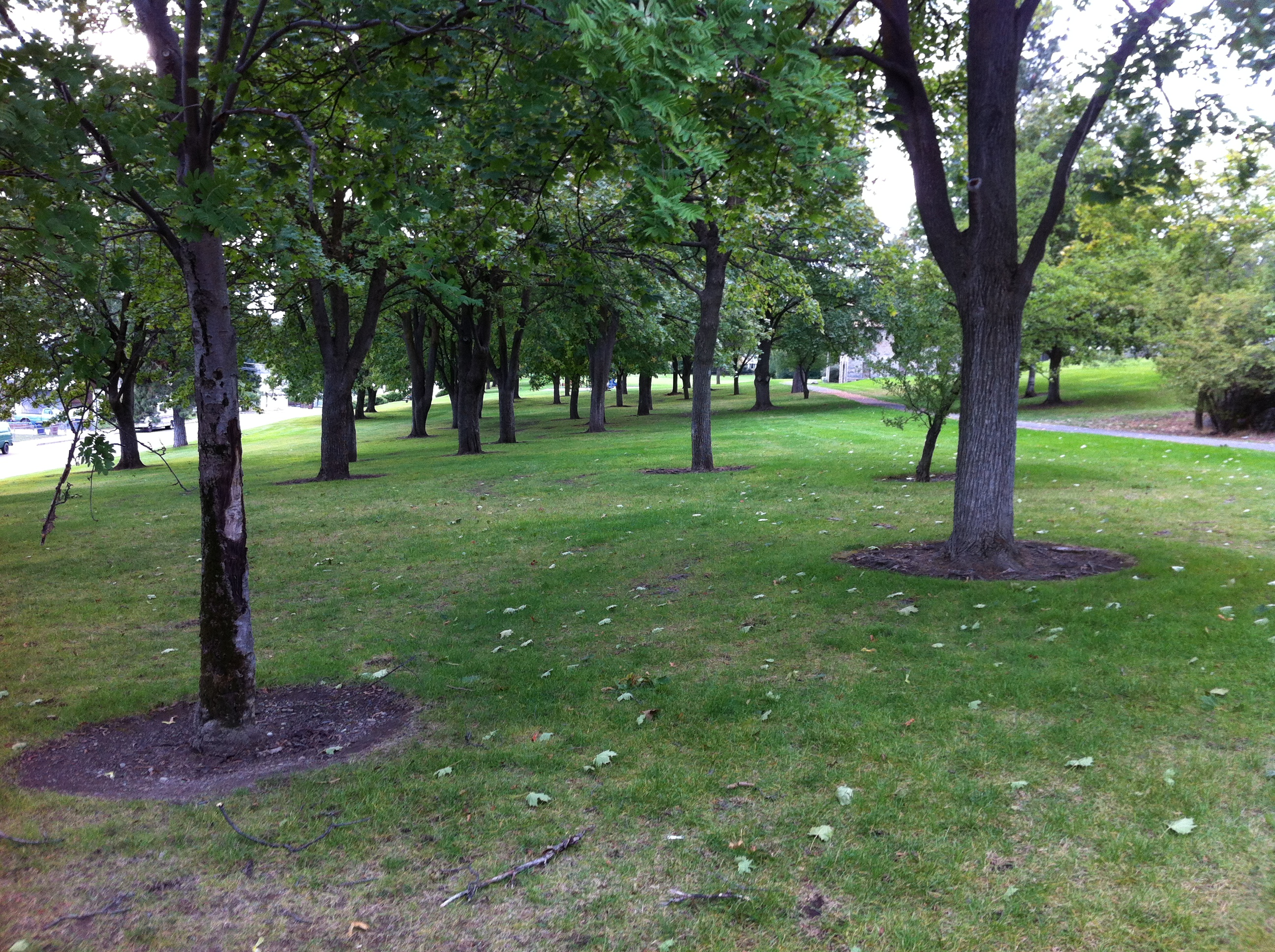
- The lawn of Minnehaha Park
- Interactive map of Minnehaha Park
- Type: Urban Park
- Location: Spokane, Washington
- Coordinates: 47°41′13″N 117°20′56″W
- Area: 39 acres (160,000 m^{2})
- Established: 1909; 117 years ago
- Operator: Spokane Parks and Recreation Department
- Status: Open year round (daily 5 a.m. to 11 p.m.)
- Public transit: Spokane Transit Authority

Minnehaha Park is a 39-acre public park located at Euclid Avenue and Havana Street in Spokane, Washington. The land for the park was acquired in 1909 but development did not begin until 1934. Prior to becoming a park the location was a spa, because of a mineral water spring on the site, and a brewery. The park served as the outdoor filming location for The Grub-Stake, a 1923 silent movie.

The park is used for casual recreation and also serves for a trail-head for hikers and mountain bikers on the rugged trail system on Beacon Hill.
