= Pauline Fjelde =

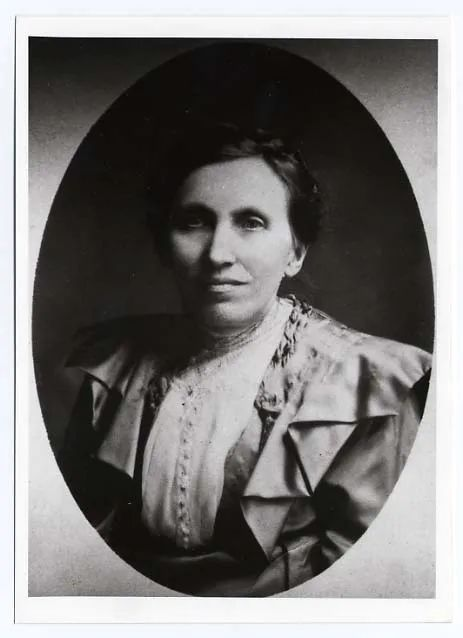
- Fjelde c. 1900
- Born: May 1861; Ålesund, Norway
- Died: December 23, 1923 (aged 62); Hennepin County, Minnesota, U.S.
- Resting place: Lakewood Cemetery, Minneapolis, Minnesota, U.S.
- Occupation: Artist
- Relatives: Jacob Fjelde (brother)

Pauline Gerhardine Fjelde (May 1861 – December 23, 1923) was a Norwegian-born American painter, embroiderer, and textile artist.

== Background ==
Pauline Gerhardine Fjelde was born in Ålesund, Møre og Romsdal county, Norway. She and her family immigrated to the United States in 1887. Pauline Fjelde is one of a lineage of family artisans. Her brother Jacob Fjelde created many of the sculptures found in Minneapolis parks. Pauline Fjelde was also the aunt of noted American sculptor Paul Fjelde and the great-aunt of his son, Ibsen scholar Rolf G. Fjelde.

== Career ==
Pauline Fjelde was a highly skilled textile artist. She studied gobelin weaving at the Gobelins Manufactory in Paris. She was associated with the development of the European Arts and Crafts movement within Norwegian-American textile arts.

In 1893, the Minnesota State Legislature commissioned the design of an official state flag for display at an exhibit at the fairgrounds in Chicago at the World’s Columbian Exposition. Amelia Hyde Center submitted the winning design. Pauline Fjelde and her sister, Thomane, were contracted to produce the actual prototype flag. The Minnesota flag earned a gold medal for embroidery at the Chicago exposition.

== Legacy ==
Her works have been on display at the Minneapolis Institute of the Arts and are in a permanent collection at Vesterheim Norwegian-American Museum in Decorah, Iowa. Some of her oil paintings also reside at the Smithsonian Institution in Washington, D.C. The Hennepin History Museum maintains a file containing her career. Family photos are in the Minnesota Historical Society database.

In 2010, a Daughters of Norway lodge was established in Minneapolis, Minnesota. The lodge chose Pauline Fjelde as its namesake in honor of her contributions to Minnesota as a Norwegian immigrant.
