= List of county and regional parks in Minnesota =

Map of Minnesota

This is a list of county and regional parks in Minnesota.

== Aitkin County ==
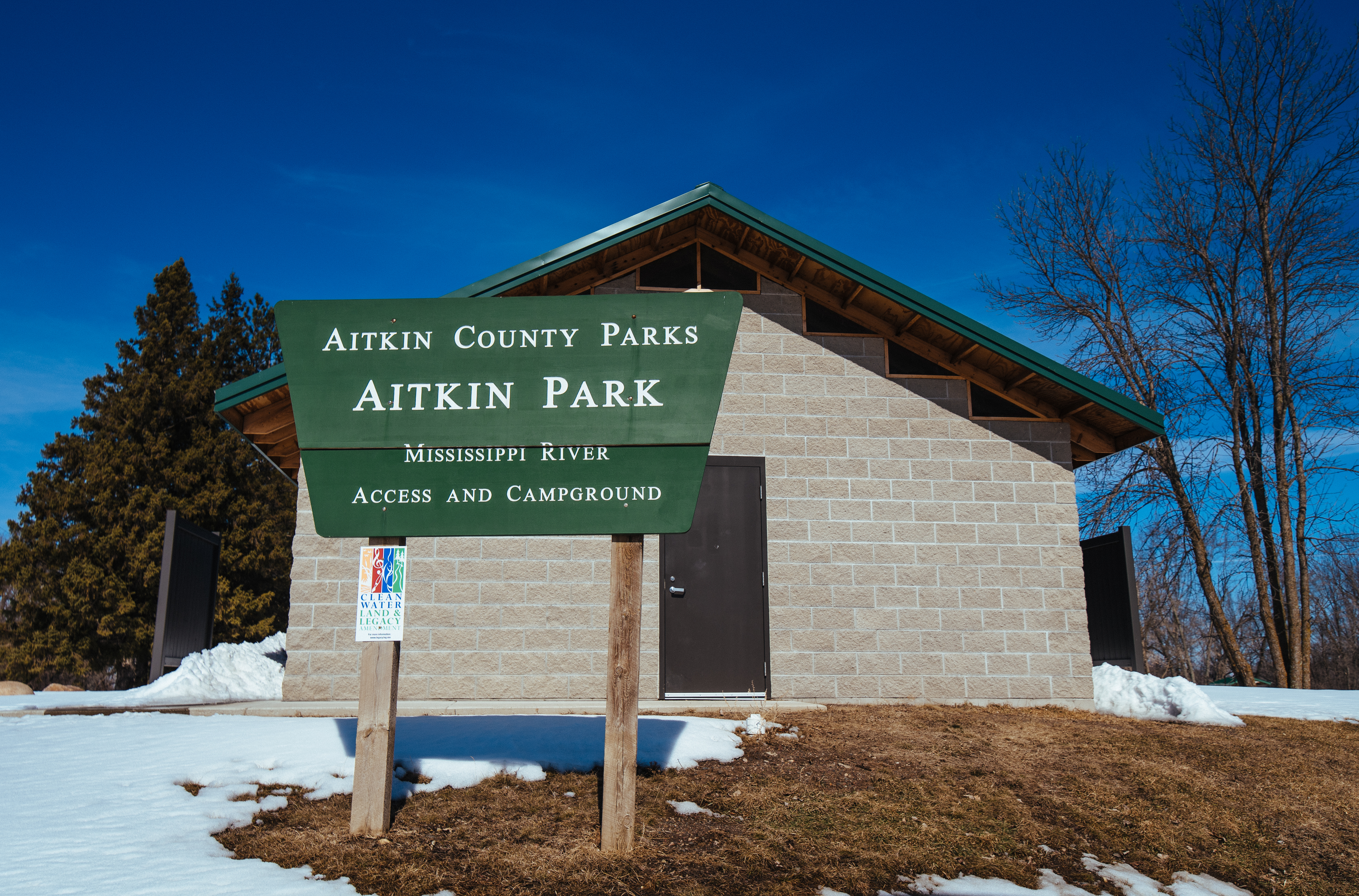
Aitkin Park

- Aitkin Park
- Long Lake Conservation Center
- Berglund Park
- Jacobson Campground
- Jacobson Wayside Rest
- Snake River Campground

== Anoka County ==
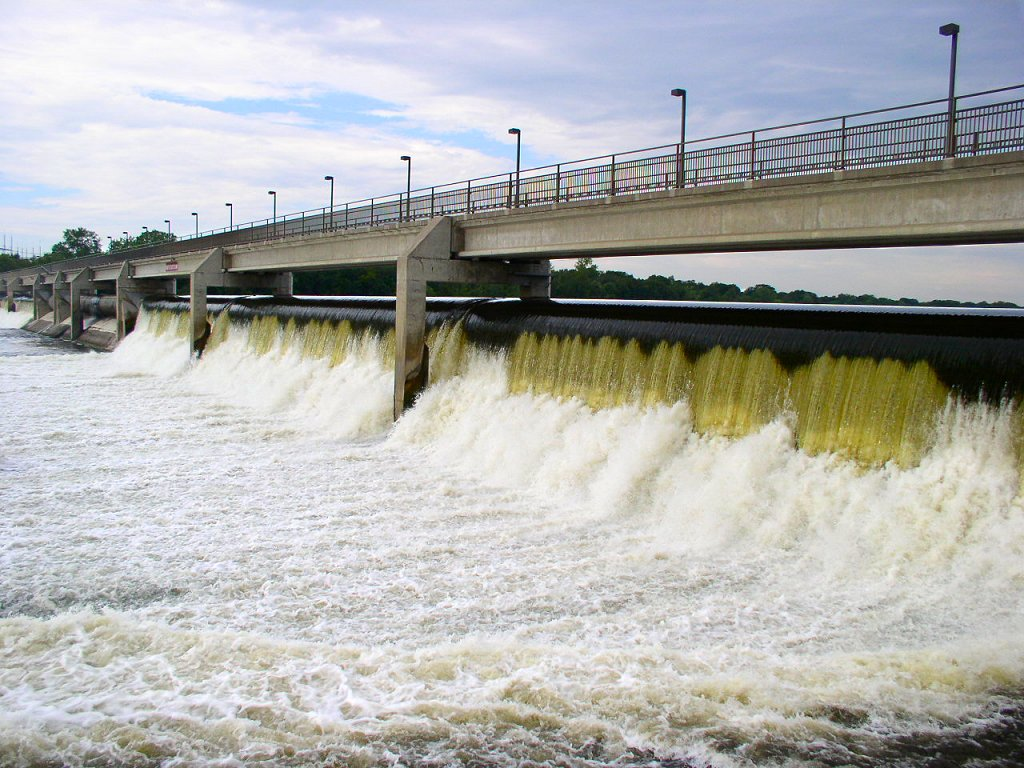
Coon Rapids Dam Regional Park

Official site

- Anoka County Riverfront Regional Park
- Bunker Hills Regional Park
- Coon Lake County Park
- Coon Rapids Dam Regional Park
- East Twin Lake County Park
- Islands of Peace County Park
- Kordiak County Park
- Lake George Regional Park
- Locke County Park
- Manomin County Park
- Martin-Island-Linwood Lakes Regional Park
- Mississippi West Regional Park
- Rice Creek Chain of Lakes Regional Park Reserve
- Rum River Central Regional Park
- Rum River North County Park
- Rum River South County Park

== Becker County ==
Official site

- Clauson Park
- Dunton Locks County Park
- Pine Grove Rest Area

== Beltrami County ==
Official site

- Grant Creek Horse Camp
- Mississippi High Banks
- Movil Maze Recreational Area
- Northland Regional Sports Park
- Pine Tree Park
- Rognlien Park
- Three Island Lake County Park
- Wilton Trails Northwest

== Benton County ==
Official site

- Bend in the River Regional Park
- Benton Beach County Park
- Mayhew Lake County Park
- Rose Anna Beach
- St. George Township Park
- St. Regis Park
- Wapicada Village / Mayhew Park

== Big Stone County ==
- Toqua Park

== Bloomington ==
Official site

- Hyland-Bush-Anderson Lakes Park Reserve

== Blue Earth County ==
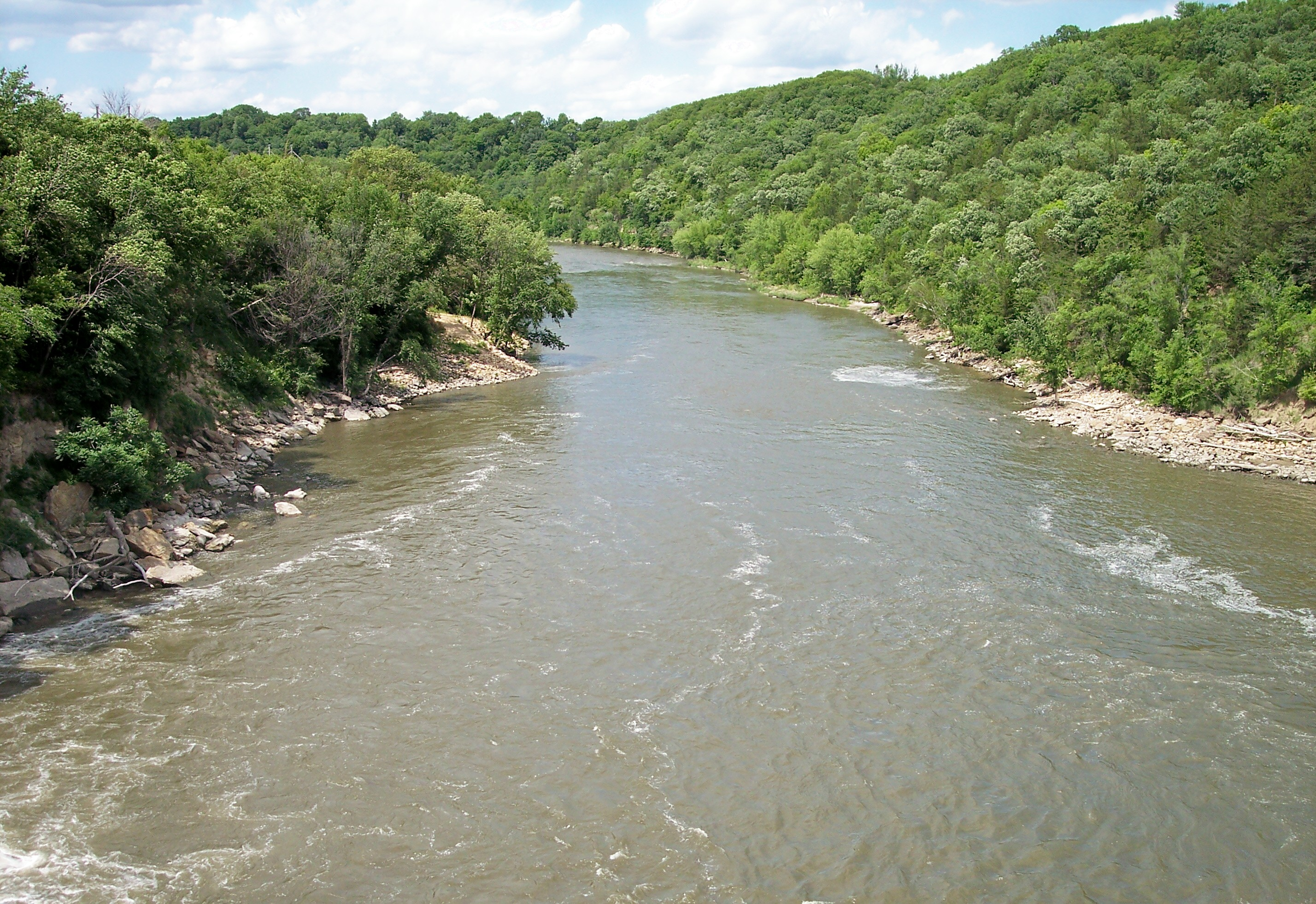
Rapidan Dam Park

Official site

- Bray Park
- Daly Park
- Duck Lake Park
- Farrish Johnson Wildlife Area
- Indian Lake Conservation Area
- Lake George Park
- Lone Pine Park
- Rapidan Dam Park
- Red Jacket Park
- Schimek Park
- Wildwood Park
- Williams Nature Center

== Brown County ==
- Lake Hanska County Park
- Lost Dog and Fox Hunter’s County Park
- Mound Creek County Park
- Treml County Park

== Carlton County ==
- Bear Lake County Park
- Chub Lake County Park
- Island Lake County Park
- Kalavala County Park

== Carver County ==
Official site

- Baylor Regional Park
- Lake Minnewashta Regional Park
- Lake Waconia Regional Park

== Chippewa County ==
- Buffalo Lake County Park

== Chisago County ==
- Checkerboard Park
- Dennis Frandsen Park
- Fish Lake County Park
- Ki-Chi-Saga Park
- Kost Dam Park

== Clearwater County ==
- Long Lake Park and Campground

== Cottonwood County ==
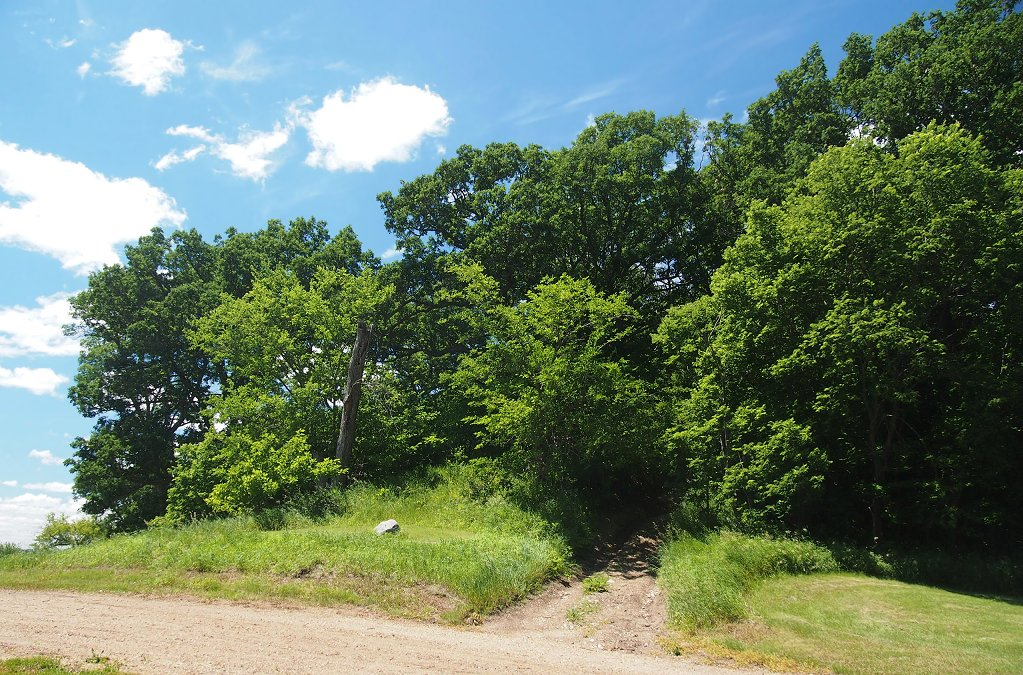
Mountain County Park

- Dynamite Park
- Mountain County Park
- Pat’s Grove
- Red Rock Falls Park
- South Dutch Charlie Park
- Talcot Lake County Park

== Dakota County ==
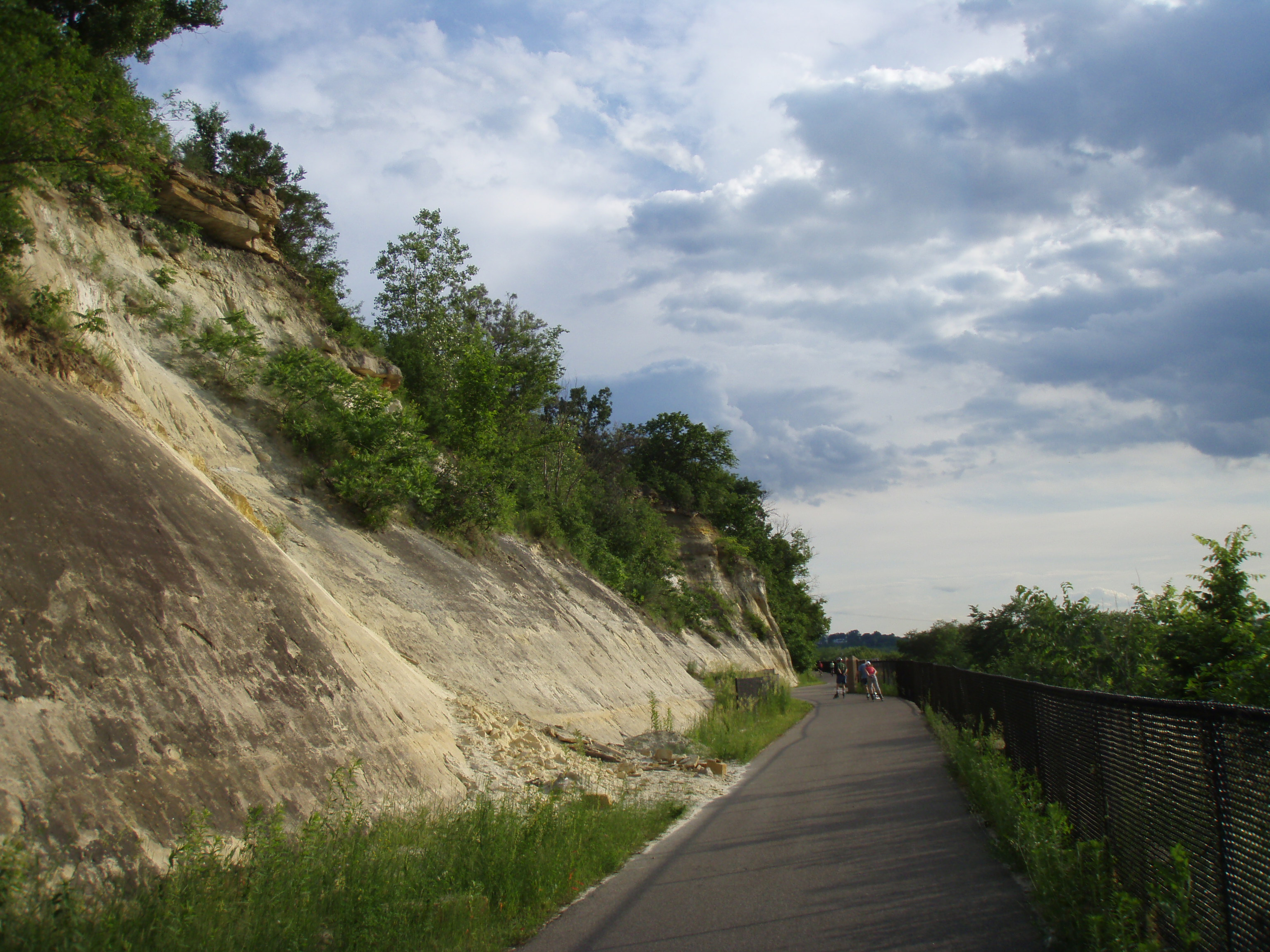
Big Rivers Regional Trail

Official site

- Big Rivers Regional Trail
- Dakota Woods Dog Park
- Lake Byllesby Regional Park
- Lebanon Hills Regional Park
- Miesville Ravine Park Reserve
- Spring Lake Park Reserve
- Thompson County Park
- Whitetail Woods Regional Park

== Douglas County ==
Official site

- Chippewa Park
- Deputy Sheriff Curtis A. Felt Memorial Park
- Kensington Runestone Park
- Lake Brophy Park
- Lake Le Homme Dieu Beach
- Spruce Hill Park

== Faribault County ==
- Pihls Park
- Woods Lake Park

== Fillmore County ==
- Bucksnort Park
- Masonic Park

== Freeborn County ==
- Arrowhead Point County Park
- Pickerel Lake County Park
- Saint Nicholas Park
- White Woods County Park

== Goodhue County ==
- Lake Byllesby County Park

== Grant County ==
- Pine Ridge Park

== Hennepin County ==
- see #Three Rivers Park District

== Houston County ==
- Wildcat Park

== Hubbard County ==
- Farris Park
- Heartland Park
- Lake George Community Park

== Isanti County ==
Official site

- Becklin Homestead Park
- Dalbo County Park
- Irving & John Anderson County Park
- Springvale County Park
- Vegsund Family County Park
- Wayside Prairie County Park

== Itasca County ==
- Bass Lake County Park
- Gunn Park

== Jackson County ==
- Anderson County Park
- Belmont County Park
- Brown County Park
- Community Point County Park
- Obie Knutson County Park
- Robertson County Park
- Sandy Point County Park
- Sparks Environmental County Park

== Kandiyohi County ==
- County Park 1, 2, 3, 4, 5, 6, & 7
- Robbins Island Regional Park

== Koochiching County ==
- Loman Park
- Nelson Park
- Rainy River Wayside
- Samuelson Park

== Lac qui Parle County ==
- Lac qui Parle County Park

== Lake County ==
Official site

- Donald D. Ferguson Demonstration Forest

== Lake of the Woods County ==
- Graceton Beach County Park

== Le Sueur County ==
- Lake Washington Park
- Ney Center Park
- Richter’s Woods Park

== Lincoln County ==
Official site

- Hole in the Mountain County Park
- Norwegian Creek County Park
- Picnic Point County Park

== Lyon County ==
Official site

- Garvin Park
- Twin Lakes Park
- Swift Lake (Tracy)

== Marshall County ==
- Florian Park

== Martin County ==
- Bright Lake County Park
- Cedar-Hanson County Park
- Klessig Park
- Perch Lake County Park
- Timberlane County Park
- Wolter Park

== McLeod County ==
- Buffalo Creek County Park
- Lake Marion Park
- Piepenburg Park
- Stahl’s Lake County Park
- Swan Lake County Park
- William May County Park

== Meeker County ==
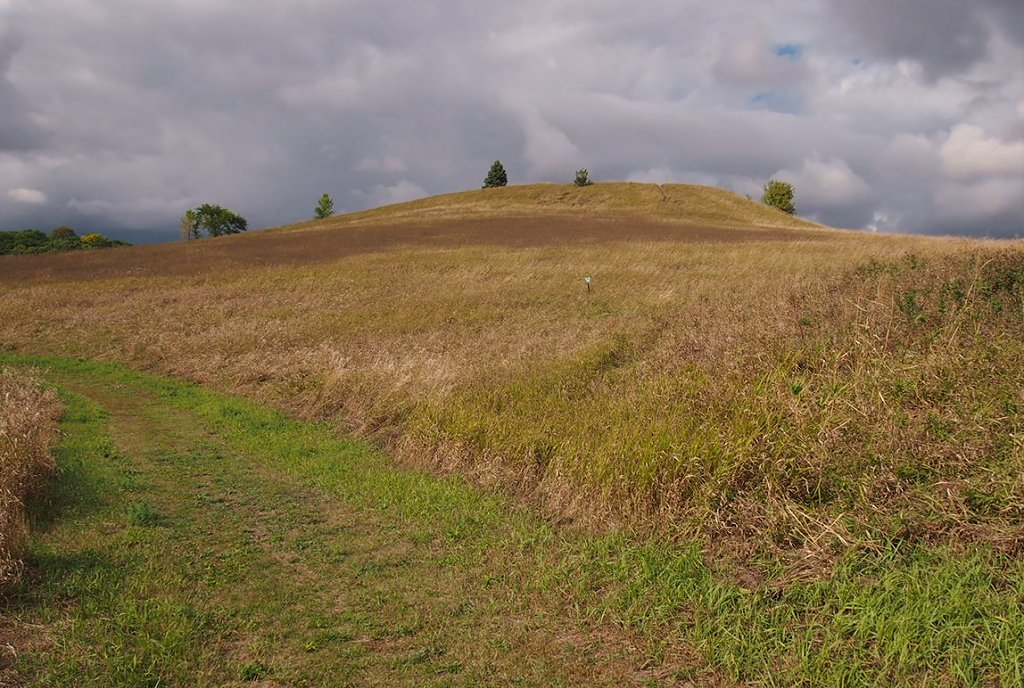
Darwin–Dassel County Park

Official site

- Clear Lake County Park
- Cosmos County Park
- Dassel–Darwin County Park
- Forest City County Park
- Kingston County Park
- Lake Koronis County Park
- Lake Manuella County Park
- Spring Lake County Park
- West Ripley Park

== Minneapolis ==
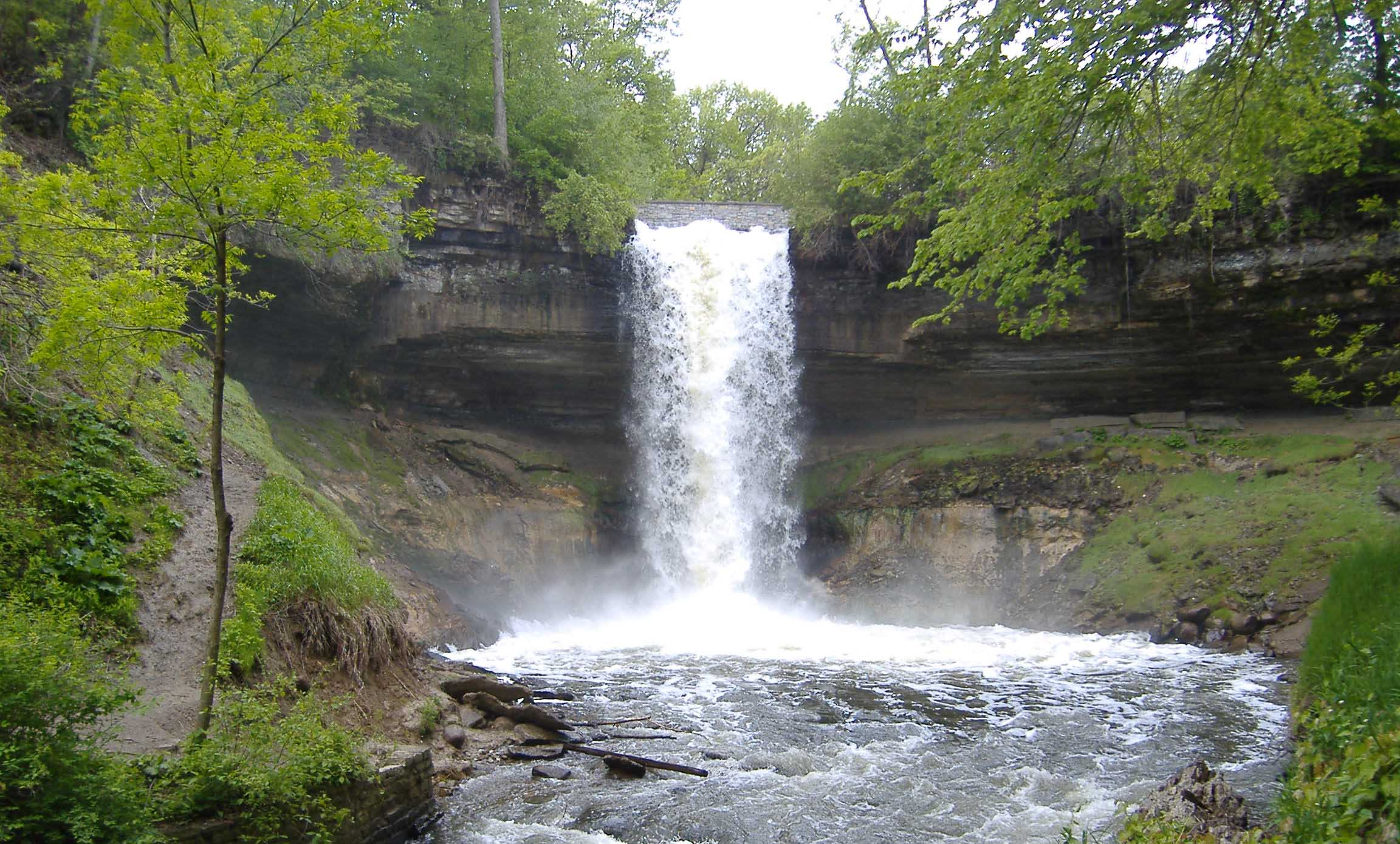
Minnehaha Park

Official site

- Chain of Lakes
- Minnehaha Park
- Mississippi Central Riverfront
- Mississippi Gorge Regional Park
- North Mississippi Regional Park
- Nokomis-Hiawatha Regional Park
- Theodore Wirth Park

== Morrison County ==
- Belle Prairie County Park

== Murray County ==
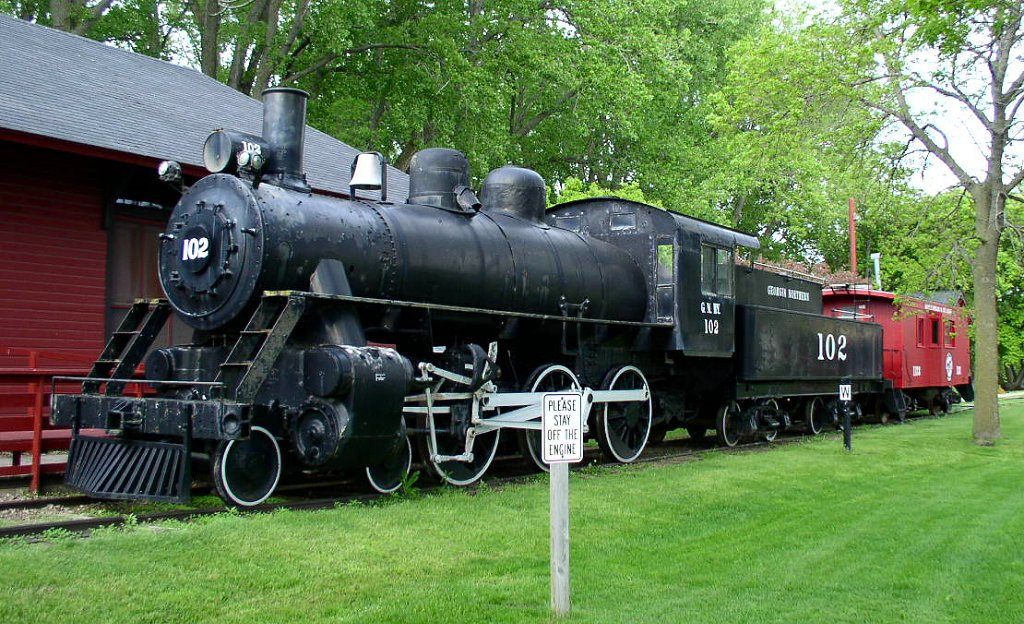
End-O-Line Railroad Park

Official site

- Corabelle Park
- End-O-Line Railroad Park
- Forman Acres
- Lake Sarah East
- Lake Sarah West
- Lime Lake Park
- Marsh's Landing
- Seven Mile Lake Park
- Swensen Park

== Nicollet County ==
Official site

- 7 Mile Park
- Minnemishinona Falls

== Nobles County ==
Official site

- Adrian Spring County Park
- Fury Island County Park
- Hawkeye County Park
- Maka-Oicu County Park
- Midway County Park
- Pickerel County Park
- Sportsman County Park
- Sunrise Prairie County Park

== Olmsted County ==
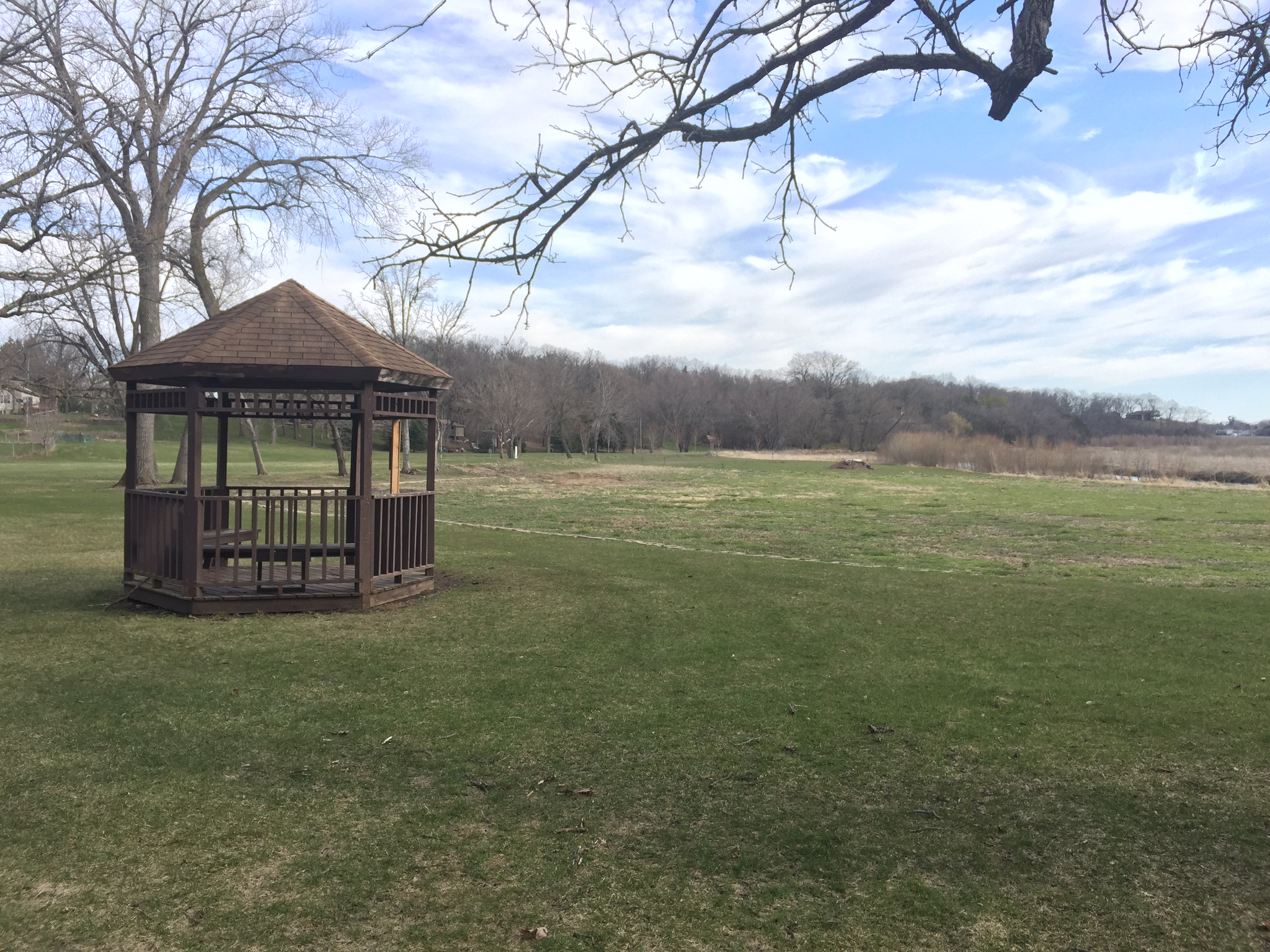
Oronoco Park

- Allis Park
- Chester Woods Park
- Graham Park
- Mayowood Corridor
- Oronoco Park
- Oxbow Park and Zollman Zoo
- White Bridge Fishing Access

== Otter Tail County ==
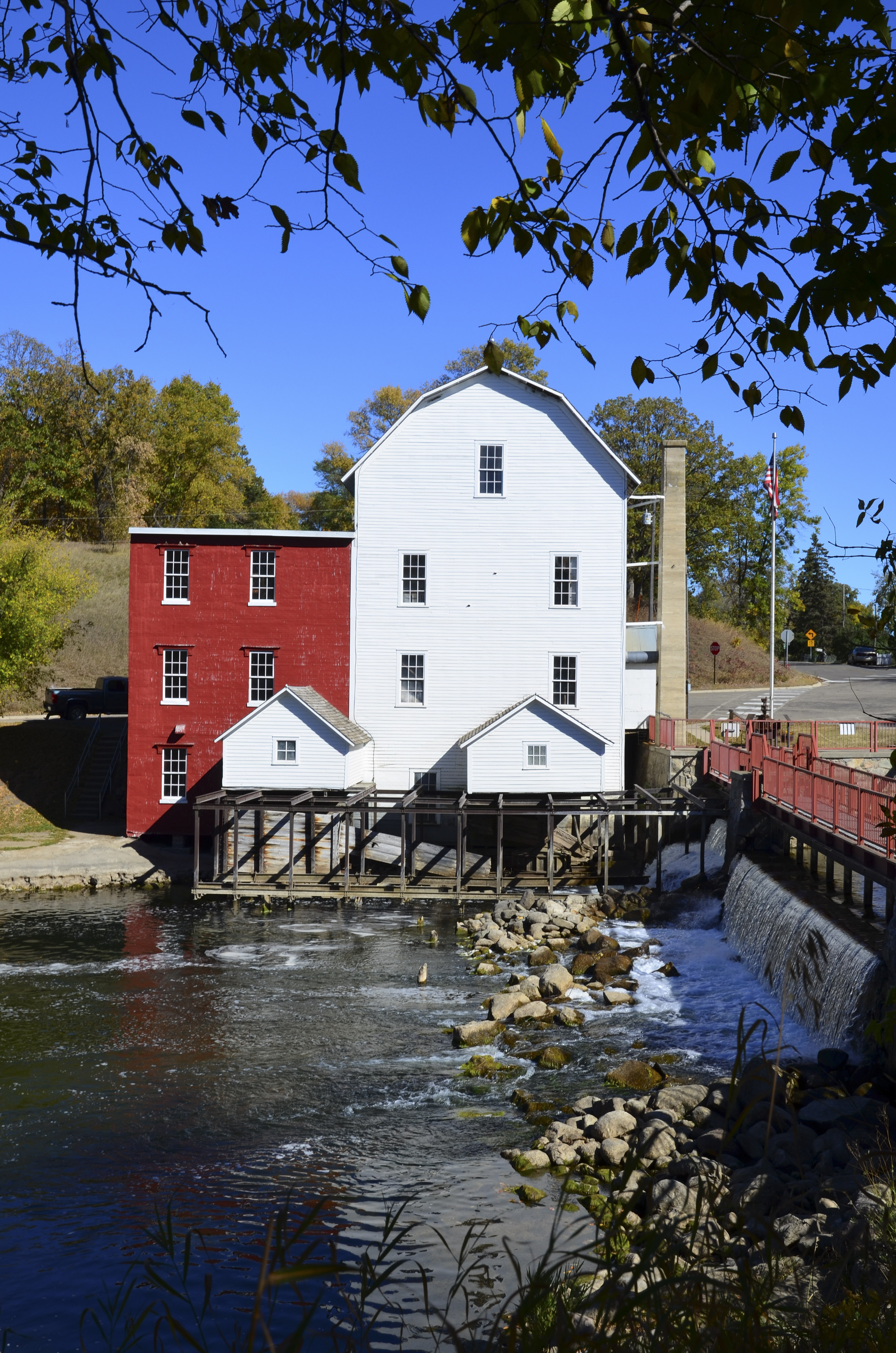
Phelps Mill County Park

- Phelps Mill County Park

== Pennington County ==
- Oakland Park

== Polk County ==
- East Shore Park
- Maple Lake County Park
- Tilberg County Park

== Ramsey County ==
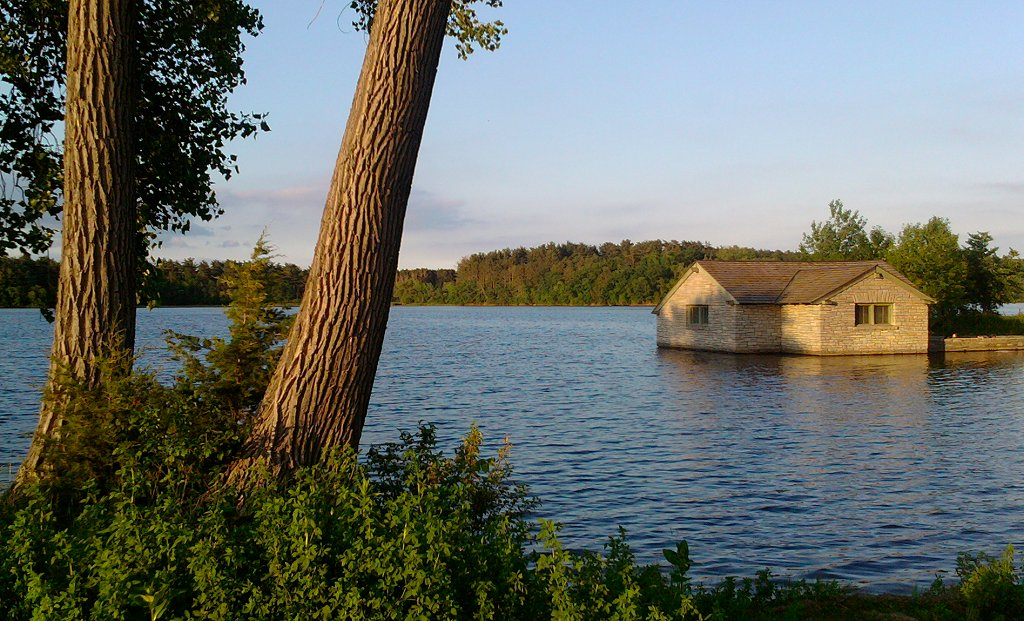
Vadnais-Snail Lakes Regional Park

Official site

- Bald Eagle-Otter Lakes Regional Park
- Battle Creek-Indian Mounds Regional Park
- Beaver Lake County Park
- Bruce Vento Regional Trail
- Island Lake County Park
- Keller-Phalen Regional Park
- Lake Gervais County Park
- Lake Josephine County Park
- Lake McCarrons County Park
- Lake Owasso County Park
- Long Lake Regional Park
- Tony Schmidt Regional Park
- Turtle Lake County Park
- Vadnais-Snail Lakes Regional Park
- White Bear Lake County Park

== Red Lake County ==
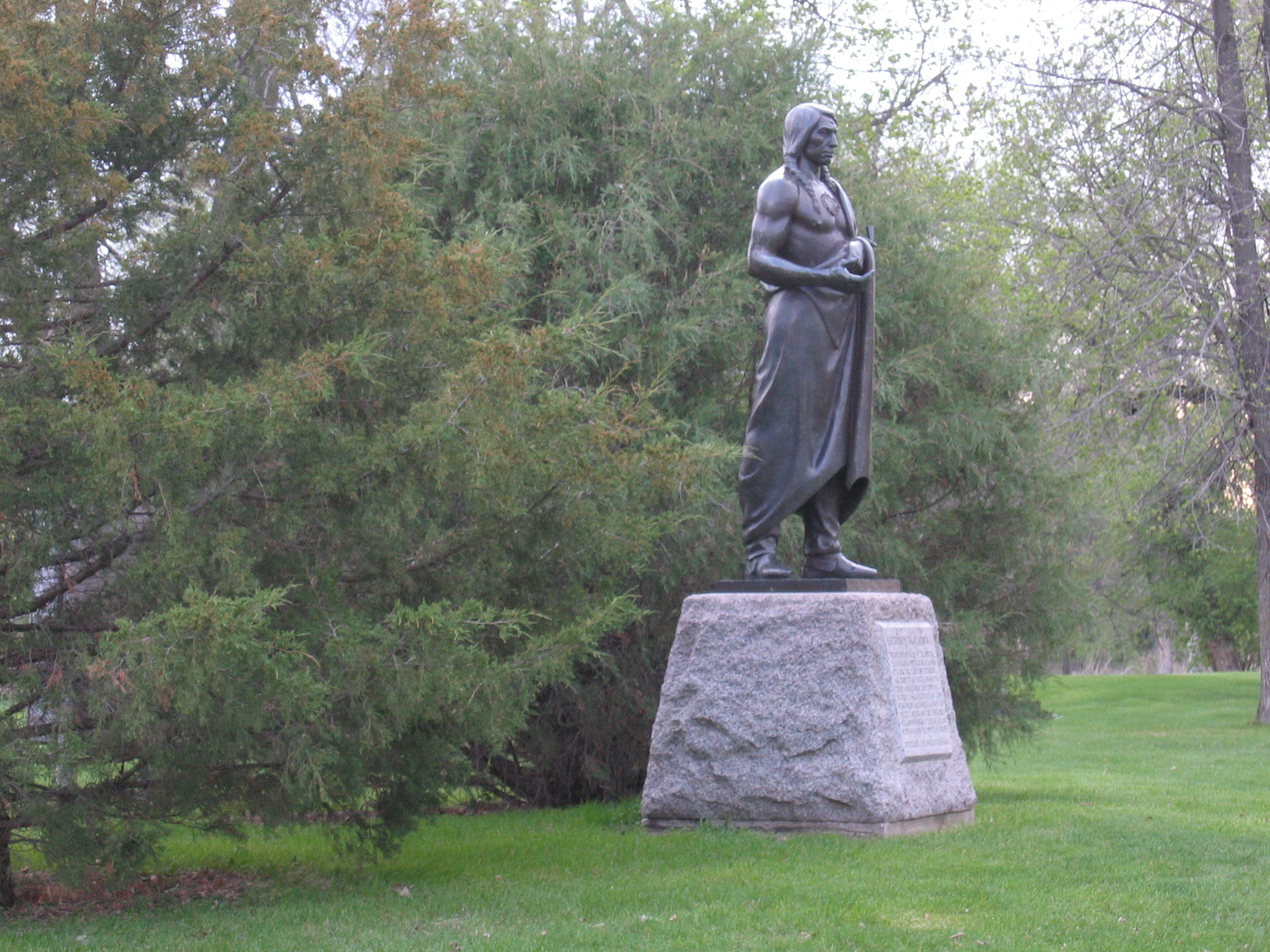
Old Crossing Treaty Park

- Old Crossing Treaty Park

== Redwood County ==
Official site

- Plum Creek Park

== Renville County ==
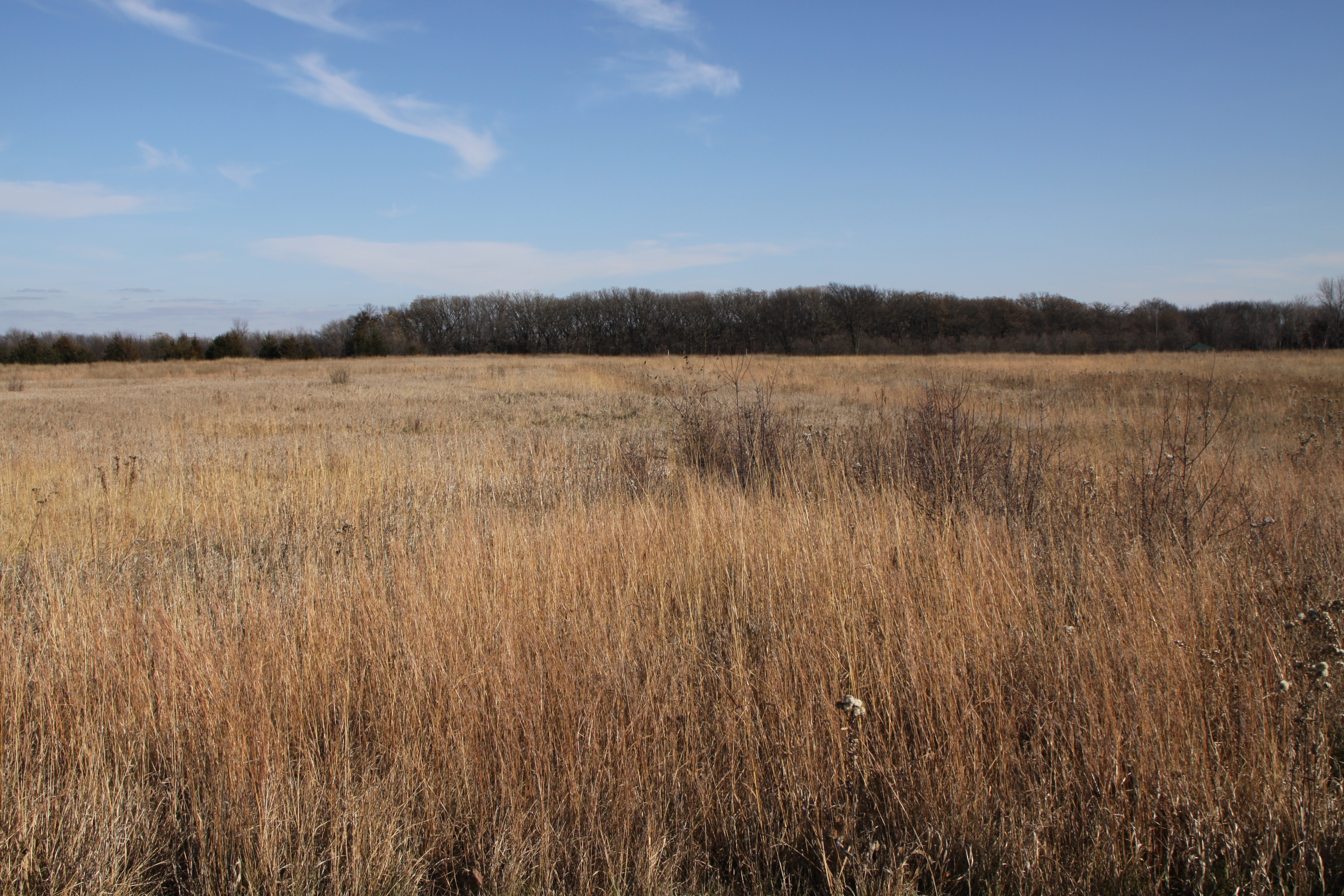
Birch Coulee County Park

Official site

- Anderson Lake County Park
- Beaver Falls County Park
- Birch Coulee County Park
- Lake Allie County Park
- Mack County Park
- Skalbekken County Park
- Vicksburg County Park

== Rice County ==
- Ackman Park
- Albers Park
- Cannon River Wilderness Area
- Caron Park
- Circle Lake Park
- Falls Creek Park
- Hirdler Park
- King Mill Park
- McCullough Park & Campground (and Heron Island bird sanctuary)
- Shager Memorial Park
- Velzke Park

== Rock County ==
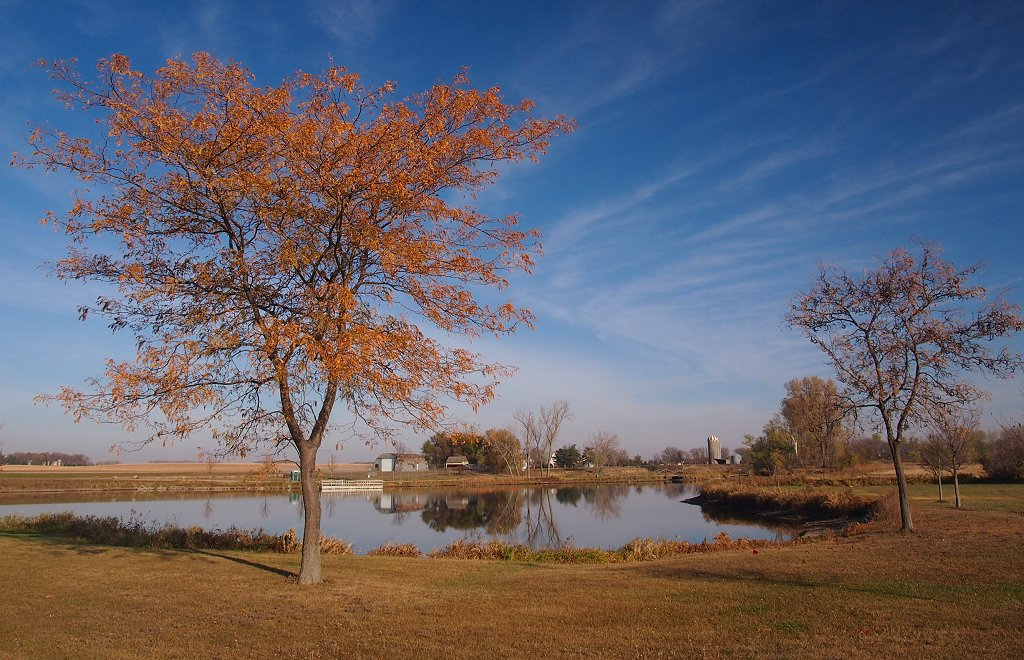
Schoneman County Park

- Schoneman County Park

== St. Louis County ==
- Bennett Park
- Olcott Park

== St. Paul ==
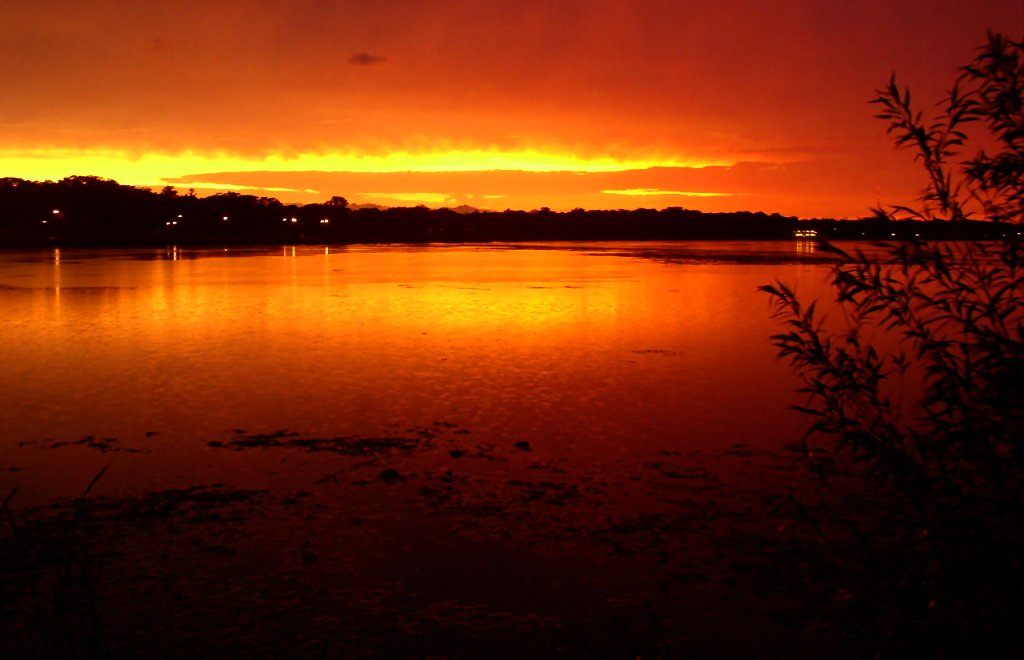
Lake Phalen in Keller-Phalen Regional Park

Official site

- Battle Creek-Indian Mounds Regional Park
- Bruce Vento Regional Trail
- Como Park, Zoo, and Conservatory
- Hidden Falls and Crosby Farm regional parks
- Keller-Phalen Regional Park
- Lilydale-Harriet Island-Cherokee Regional Park
- Mississippi Gorge

== Scott County ==
- see #Three Rivers Park District

== Sherburne County ==
- Bridgeview Park Reserve
- Grams Regional Park
- Oak Savanna Land Preserve

== Sibley County ==
Official site

- Clear Lake Park
- High Island Creek Park
- Rush River Park

== Stearns County ==
Official site

- Lake Sylvia County Park
- Mississippi River County Park
- Quarry Park and Nature Preserve
- Spring Hill County Park
- Two Rivers Lake County Park
- Upper Spunk Lake County Park
- Warner Lake County Park

== Steele County ==
Official site

- Beaver Lake County Park
- Crane Creek County Park
- Hope School County Park

== Swift County ==
- Appleton Area Off-Highway Vehicle Park
- Swift Falls Park

== Three Rivers Park District ==
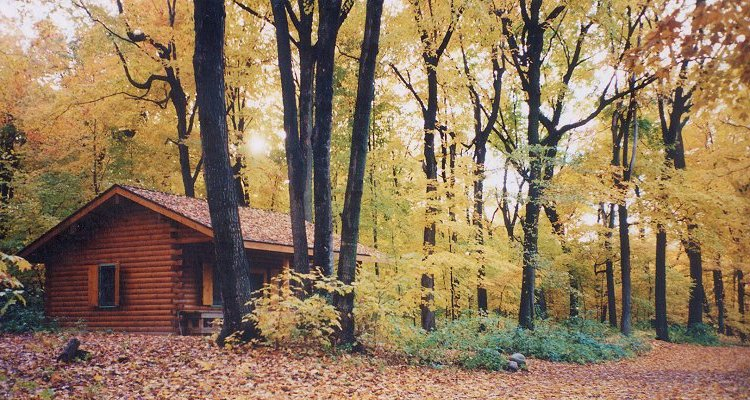
Baker Park Reserve

Official site

- Baker Park Reserve
- Bryant Lake Regional Park
- Carver Park Reserve
- Cleary Lake Regional Park
- Clifton E. French Regional Park
- Coon Rapids Dam Regional Park
- Crow-Hassan Park Reserve
- Eagle Lake Regional Park
- Elm Creek Park Reserve
- Fish Lake Regional Park
- Gale Woods Farm
- Glen Lake Golf and Practice Center
- Historic Murphy’s Landing
- Hyland Lake Park Reserve
- Lake Minnetonka Regional Park
- Lake Rebecca Park Reserve
- Murphy-Hanrehan Park Reserve
- Noerenberg Memorial Park
- North Mississippi Regional Park
- Silverwood Park

== Todd County ==
- Battle Point Park
- Pete’s Park
- Traverse County Park

== Wadena County ==
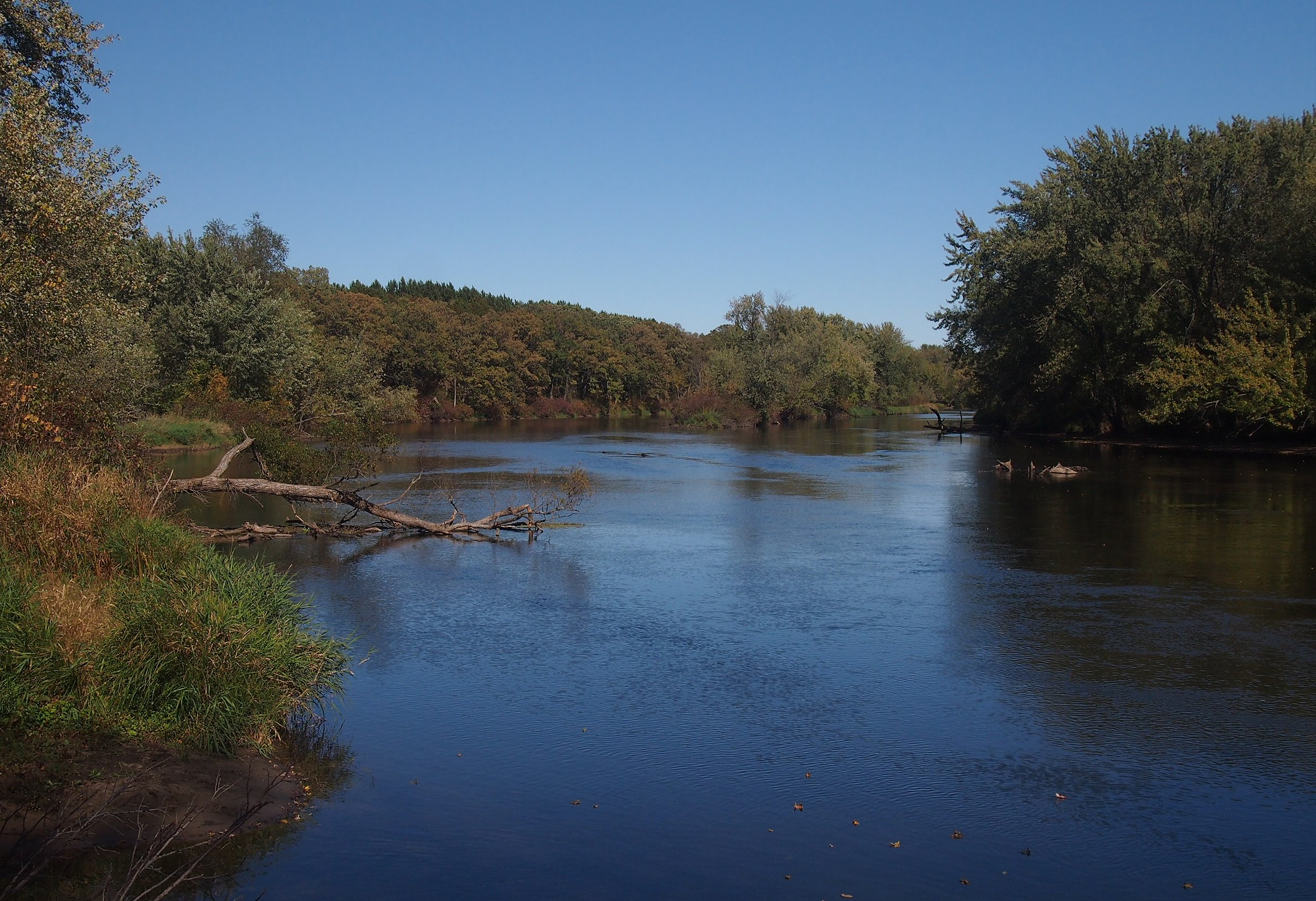
The Crow Wing River in Old Wadena County Park

Official site

- Anderson's Crossing
- Bullard Bluff
- Cottingham County Park
- Frame's Landing
- Knob Hill
- Little White Dog
- McGivern County Park
- Old Wadena County Park
- Stigman's Mound County Park
- Tree Farm Landing

== Waseca County ==
Official site

- Blowers Park
- Courthouse Park
- Eustice Park
- Okaman Park

== Washington County ==
Official site

- Big Marine Park Reserve
- Cottage Grove Ravine Regional Park
- Hardwood Creek Regional Trail
- Lake Elmo Park Reserve
- Pine Point Regional Park
- Point Douglas Park
- St. Croix Bluffs Regional Park
- Square Lake Park

== Watonwan County ==
- Eagles Nest County Park
- Kansas Lake Park
- Long Lake Park

== Winona County ==
- Apple Blossom Overlook Park
- Farmers Community Park

== Wright County ==
Official site

- Albright's Mill County River Park
- Beebe Lake Regional Park
- Betty Mason County River Park
- Bill Anderson Memorial County River Park
- Carl Johnson County Forest
- Clearwater/Pleasant Regional Park
- Clearwater Wayside
- Collinwood Regional Park
- Crow Springs County River Park
- Dustin Monument Wayside
- Fairhaven Mill Historic Wayside
- Harry Larson County Forest
- Humphrey Arends County River Park
- Marcus Zumbrunnen County Park
- Montissippi Regional Park
- Mud Lake County Park
- Oscar and Anna Johnson County Park
- Otsego Regional Park
- Riverside County River Park
- Robert Ney Memorial Park Reserve
- Schroeder Regional Park
- Stanley Eddy Memorial Park Reserve
- Stirewalt Memorial County Park
- Wildlife County River Park

== Yellow Medicine County ==
- Oraas County Park
- Timm County Park
