= Highland Park, Saint Paul =

Highland Park
- Neighborhood
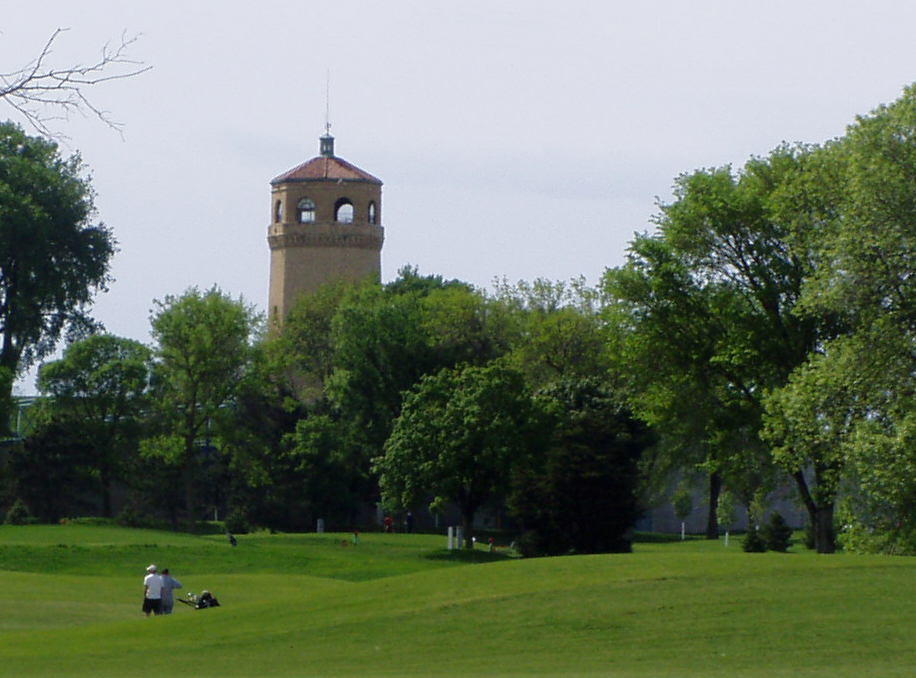
- The old Highland Park Water Tower, listed on the National Register of Historic Places.
- Interactive map of Highland Park
- Coordinates: 44°55′4″N 93°10′1″W
- Country: United States
- State: Minnesota
- County: Ramsey
- City: Saint Paul

Area
  - Total: 6.038 sq mi (15.64 km^{2})

Population (2020)
  - Total: 25,111
  - Density: 4,159/sq mi (1,606/km^{2})
- Time zone: UTC-6 (CST)
  - Summer (DST): UTC-5 (CDT)
- ZIP code: 55116
- Area code: 651
- Website: http://www.highlanddistrictcouncil.org/

Highland Park is a neighborhood in the southwestern corner of Saint Paul, Minnesota, United States. Also known as Highland District Council (District 15), it lies along the Mississippi River just north of Fort Snelling and across the river from Minneapolis–Saint Paul International Airport. At the 2000 census, Highland Park had a population of 23,202.

== Government ==
The Highland District Council is one of 17 neighborhood district councils in Saint Paul. The district councils were formed in 1975 to advise the Saint Paul City Council on issues related to the development of its area as well as city and state issues. The HDC Board of Directors is composed of community volunteers elected to serve two-year terms.

== History ==
The land known today as Highland Park was once a part of the Fort Snelling reserve, where no settlement was allowed until 1844, when a veteran of the Mexican–American War, William Finn, was the first white person to settle in Highland Park permanently in 1848. He was granted a large portion of land along the Mississippi River and built a house on land that the University of St. Thomas now occupies. During this time, much of the Highland Park area was encompassed by the Fort Snelling reservation, but by the mid–1850s the government opened up most of that land for sale, and the area became Reserve Township. Growth in the area had pressured the government into making this move, and in 1854, about 5,000 acres (20 km^{2}) were sold at about $1.25 per acre. This sale opened the area to settlement, and the area in Ramsey County that was first settled became the last in Saint Paul to be densely populated. Highland Park became part of the City of Saint Paul in 1887, when Reserve Township was purchased.

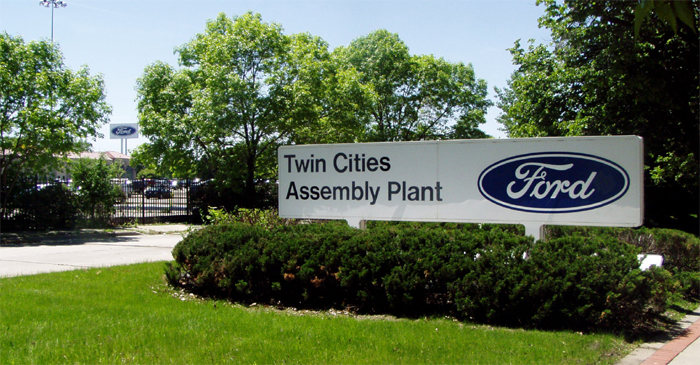
The Twin Cities Assembly Plant

From 1925 to 2011, the Ford Motor Company opened the Twin Cities Assembly Plant (originally for Model T automobiles) in Highland Park and caused much of the area's remaining farmland to be subdivided for the autoworkers. In 1927, the Intercity Bridge was built to carry workers over the river from Minneapolis to the plant. Construction started in 1927 on the Highland Park Water Tower, a structure that still stands today and has become a landmark on the highest part of Saint Paul.

After World War II Highland Park experienced another population boom, a large number of new houses were built, the Highland Village Shopping Center was expanded, and the Sibley Plaza Shopping Center was finished.

== Community ==
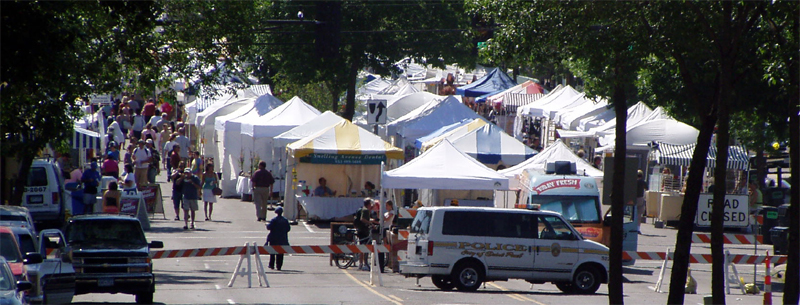
2006 Highland Fest, art fair area

Highland Park has a mix of well-maintained older housing, commercial and retail property, and light industrial buildings. The Ford Plant was to close in 2008, along with the Norfolk, Virginia Ford F-series pickup plant, but Ford reached an agreement with the United Auto Workers to keep it open until 2011. In September 2017, the St. Paul City Council approved a master plan and zoning designed to redevelop the 122-acre (49 ha) site and add as many as 4,000 new housing units. In April 2021, the City Council approved the names of four new parks to be developed on the former Ford site with support from the Saint Paul Parks and Recreation Commission. These new names received final input from members of the Dakota community and the Saint Paul Youth Commission. They are Gateway Park, Assembly Union Park, UÅeÄii MakÈa Park (oon-CHEE Ma-KAH, "Mother Earth" in Dakota), and MíÄia Park (MEE-cha, abbreviation for "coyote" in Dakota). On June 14, 2022, Gateway Park opened on the former Ford site, now known as Highland Bridge. It has a skating trail and bowl, biofiltration basin, and a stormwater pond with nature trails that run the length of the park.

Highland Park became the city's primary Jewish neighborhood after most of the Jewish population moved from the Summit-University neighborhood in the mid-1900s, and it is home to most of the city's synagogues.

Highland Park is served locally by the Villager newspaper, which has a subscription base of 65,000. The Highland Park Business Association in cooperation with local community volunteers presents Highland Fest, in the Highland Village, an annual festival that features music, carnival rides, an art fair, and fireworks.

The neighborhood's public schools are Highland Park Elementary, Horace Mann Elementary, and EXPO for Excellence Elementary school, Highland Park Middle School (formerly Highland Park Junior High), and Highland Park Senior High School. Saint Catherine's University is also in the neighborhood, as are several private schools.

Two of St. Paul's oldest and largest parks lie along the Mississippi River bank, Crosby Farm and Hidden Falls. Across the Mississippi River, Pike Island in Fort Snelling State Park is technically within the neighborhood's boundaries.

== Demographics ==
As of 2020, the population of Highland Park was 25,111, split 48.5% male and 51.5% female.

14.7% of the population were foreign-born residents, and 17.5% spoke a language other than English at home. 8.1% of residents spoke English less than "very well".

11.7% of households had no access to a vehicle. Among workers 16 years and older, 73.4% commuted to work via car, 7.0% used public transit, and 19.6% walked, biked, worked at home, or used some other method. 9.2% of residents lived below the poverty line, and 2.2% were unemployed. 46.2% of housing in the neighborhood was renter-occupied.

Race/ethnicity	Share of total population (2020)
Total	100%
One race	94.7%
White	72.5%
Black or African American	14.9%
Asian	3.2%
Hispanic	3.9%
Other	0.2%
Two or more races	5.3%
