= Watergate Marina =

Dock on the Mississippi River in Saint Paul, Minnesota, United States

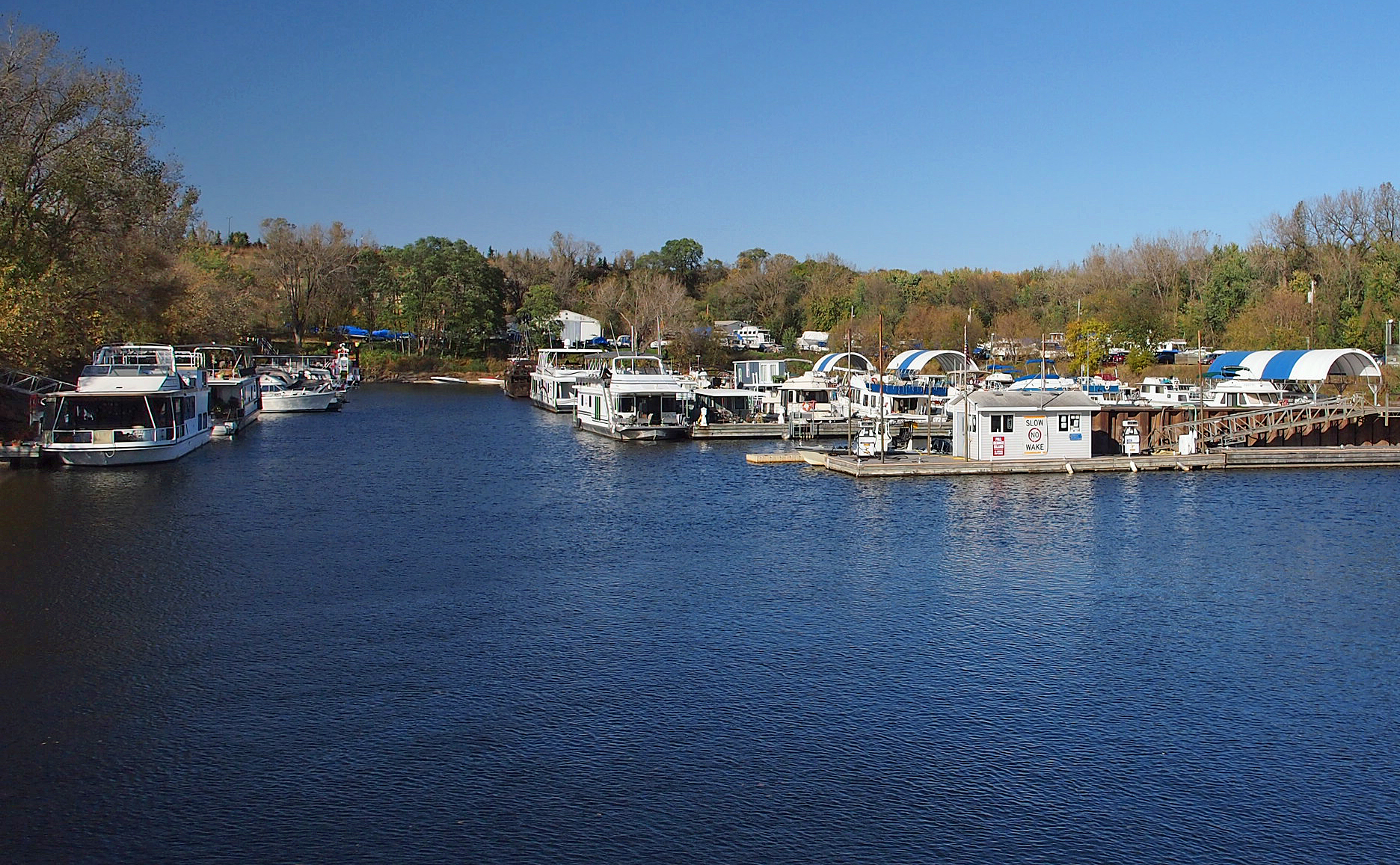
- Watergate Marina viewed from the Mississippi River, 2015
- Interactive map of Watergate Marina
- Type: River dock
- Location: Saint Paul, Minnesota, United States
- Coordinates: 44.897874°N 93.167998°W
- Status: Open seasonally
- Website: Watergate Marina

Watergate Marina is located on the north bank of the Mississippi River in Saint Paul, Minnesota, United States, upriver from the city's downtown area. Owned by the City of Saint Paul and operated via lease, the privately run, full-service marina has capacity for 160 ships and it charges fees for boat launches.

== Amenities ==
On the Mississippi, the marina's boat ramp is located at river mile 844.8L, on the opposite bank of Pike Island. The marina is located within Crosby Farm Regional Park and is accessed on land via Shepard Road, just west of Davern Avenue, in Saint Paul.

The marina lies in the middle of the 6.7-mile (10.8 km), multi-use trail system connecting Hidden Falls to its east and to Crosby Farm to its west. The area of the two parks features four miles (6.4 km) of riverfront shoreline and is within the Mississippi National River and Recreation Area. In 2013, long-term plans by the City of Saint Paul called for redevelopment of the marina with an environmental education center and multi-use access points to the river.

== See also ==
- History of Saint Paul, Minnesota
- Upper Mississippi River
