= Mississippi National River and Recreation Area =

National Park Service area in the United States

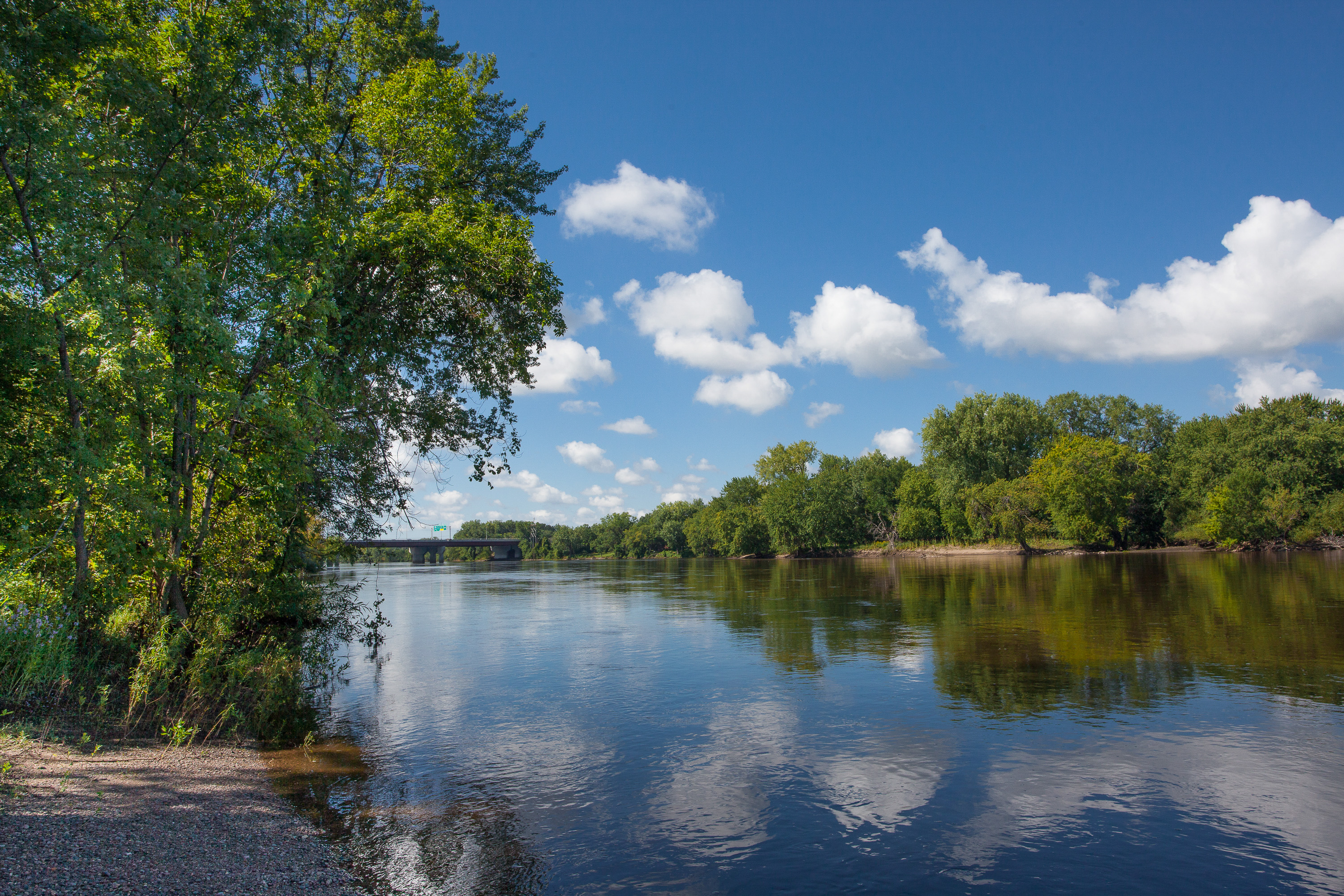

- Location within Minnesota Location within the United States
- Interactive map of Mississippi National River and Recreation Area
- Location: Minnesota, United States
- Nearest city: Minneapolis/St. Paul, Minnesota
- Coordinates: 44°52′24″N 93°01′08″W
- Area: 53,775 acres (21,762 ha)
- Established: November 18, 1988
- Visitors: 224,722 (in 2025)
- Governing body: National Park Service along with other private organizations.
- Website: Mississippi National River and Recreation Area

The Mississippi National River and Recreation Area is a 72-mile (116 km) and 54,000-acre (22,000 ha) protected corridor along the Mississippi River through Minneapolis–Saint Paul in the U.S. state of Minnesota, from the cities of Dayton and Ramsey to just downstream of Hastings. This stretch of the upper Mississippi River includes natural, historical, recreational, cultural, scenic, scientific, and economic resources of national significance. This area is the only national park site dedicated exclusively to the Mississippi River. The Mississippi National River and Recreation Area is sometimes abbreviated as MNRRA (often pronounced like "minn-ruh") or MISS, the four-letter code the National Park Service assigned to the area. The Mississippi National River and Recreation Area is classified as one of four national rivers in the United States, and despite its name is technically not one of the 40 national recreation areas.

== History ==
The Mississippi National River and Recreation Area was established in 1988 as a new unique type of national park known as a partnership park. Unlike traditional national parks, the National Park Service is not a major land owner and therefore does not manage the land use directly. But the National Park Service does have special authority over local, state, and federal actions in the boundaries that regulates land use management. It works in partnership with local, state, and federal governments, nonprofits, businesses, educational institutions, and people who own land along the river or have an interest in it to achieve the National Park Service's mission to protect and preserve for future generations. Some of the park's most prominent attractions are the St. Anthony Falls Historic District (including Mill City Museum, the Guthrie Theater, the Stone Arch Bridge, and Mill Ruins Park), Fort Snelling and the adjacent Fort Snelling State Park, Minnehaha Falls, and the Winchell Trail. There are many additional attractions, trails, and programs in the Minneapolis–St. Paul metropolitan area. The park spans Anoka, Dakota, Hennepin, Ramsey, and Washington Counties, all within the Minneapolis–Saint Paul metropolitan area.

As of 2025, the area has one visitor center, inside the Science Museum of Minnesota in St. Paul, staffed by National Park Service rangers. Each year, the rangers manage community activities, including interpretive sessions, bike rides, and paddle trips, to educate the community about the area's natural and human history. In March 2025, the visitor center's lease was abruptly canceled, effective September 30, 2025, as part of government cost-saving efforts; it has since been extended.

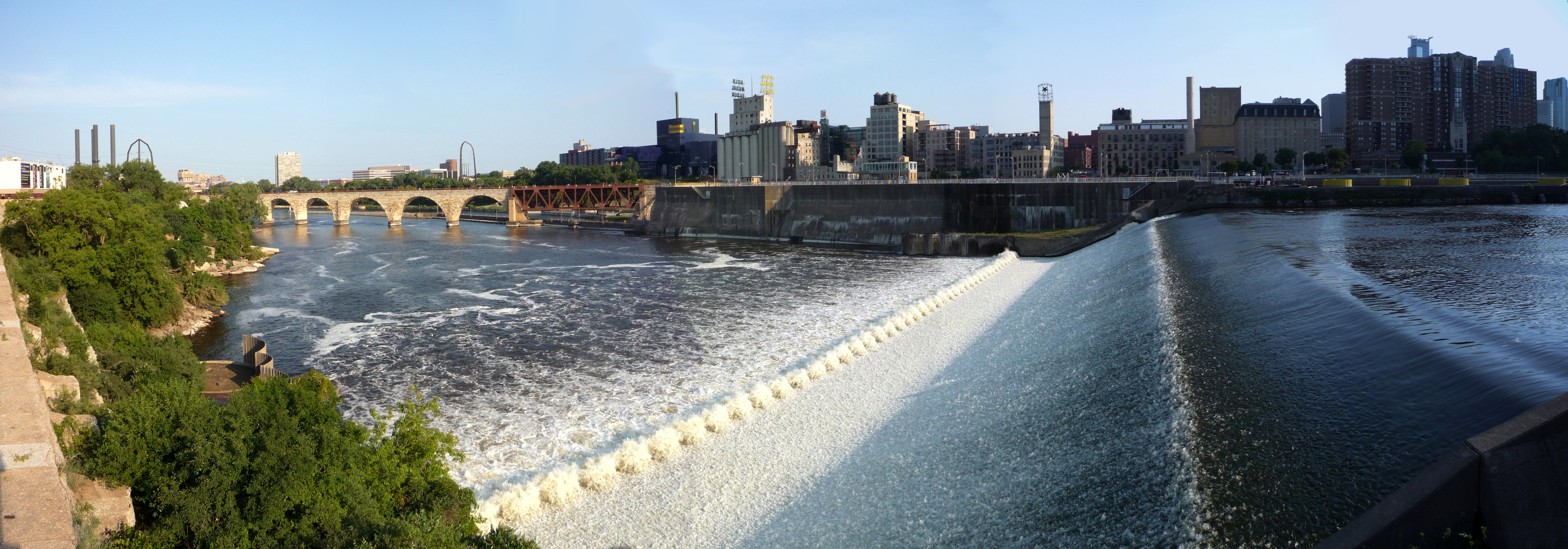
Panoramic photo, visible from this vantage: the lower portion of Saint Anthony Falls; the concrete wall on the far side of the falls is part of the locks to allow ships to pass the waterfall; to the left is the Stone Arch Bridge, above it is the Guthrie Theater; to the right of the Guthrie are the white silos and preserved shell of the former Washburn "A" Mill, now Mill City Museum; to the right of the museum are a series of redeveloped flour and grain mills making up a significant portion of the city's Mills District.

== Sections ==
The Mississippi National River and Recreation Area is between River Miles 879 and 806. The National Park Service categorizes it into five approximate sections:

1. The Wild and Scenic River (River Mile 879 to 863) — North of the Twin Cities the river is a state wild and scenic river, slowing as it reaches the Coon Rapids Dam. This segment begins at the confluence of Crow River and the Mississippi near Ramsey and Dayton and flows to Banfil Island at Brooklyn Park and Fridley.
2. The River of the Falls/The Urban River (River Mile 862 to 852) — From Brooklyn Center the river approaches several falls, beginning with Saint Anthony, and enters the historic Milling District near downtown Minneapolis.
3. The Gorge/Where the Rivers Meet (River Mile 852 to 843) — After the Milling District, the river enters the Mississippi gorge that extends past Fort Snelling State Park to its confluence with the Minnesota River.
4. The Working River (River Mile 840 to 833) — From near downtown Saint Paul, the river begins to feature towboats and barge traffic as it winds to the Pig's Eye Lake Scientific and Natural Area.
5. The Forested Floodplain (River Mile 833 to 806) — From South Saint Paul, the river widens further with numerous backwaters and the bluffs are higher. Past Hastings and toward the Vermillion River, the Mississippi becomes wilder again.

== Places to visit ==
The park's website lists the following locations or features as partner sites.

Partner Site	River Mile	Management Level	Managing Body	Area	Date Opened to Public	Summary
Akin Riverside Park	~871.7; 45°11′41″N 93°23′28″W	City	City of Anoka Parks & Recreation	6.5 acres (2.6 ha)		Interprets Anoka city history just above the mouth of the Rum River. The 1914 Windego Park Auditorium/Open Air Theater is on the NRHP.
Ard Godfrey House	~854.5; 44°59′19″N 93°15′24″W	City	Minneapolis Park and Recreation Board, The Woman's Club of Minneapolis		1979	Built 1849, the oldest wood-frame house in Minneapolis.
Banfill Tavern	~862; 45°5′20″N 93°16′34″W	County/Non-profit	Anoka County Parks		1988	A renovated 1847 inn, once a way station on the Red River Ox Cart Trail. (Until April 2022, the home of Banfill-Locke Center for the Arts, now the North Suburban Center for the Arts .) Located in Manomin County Park.
Battle Creek Regional Park	~834–837; 44°56′27″N 93°0′17″W	County	Ramsey County Parks and Recreation	1,840 acres (740 ha)	1925	Park comprises three parcels, including a ravine where Dakotas won a battle against Ojibwe intent on attacking Kaposia village in 1842.
Bohemian Flats	unknown 44.975278°N 93.241389°W	City	Minneapolis Park and Recreation Board	unknown	1867	Park on the west bank of the Mississippi River near the University of Minnesota that was the former site of a shanty town in the city's early history.
Boom Island Park	854.8; 44°59′37″N 93°16′9″W	City	Minneapolis Park and Recreation Board	22.5 acres (9.1 ha)	1987	Once the site of log booms to sort lumber to the owning sawmill, this former island features a marina, riverboat tours, and an ornamental lighthouse.
The Brickyards of St. Paul	~841.5; 44°55′6″N 93°6′44″W	City	St. Paul Parks and Recreation	N/A	2007	Kiln ruins and shale quarries remain from a brickmaking company that operated from 1894 to the 1970s. Fossil collecting and ice climbing are allowed in the quarries with a permit. Part of Lilydale Regional Park.
Bruce Vento Nature Sanctuary	~838.5; 44°57′11″N 93°4′29″W	City	St. Paul Parks and Recreation	29 acres (12 ha)	2005	Rehabilitated from a former trainyard and industrial site. Includes Wakan Tipi/Carver's Cave.
Coldwater Spring	~840.0; 44°53.96′N 93°11.77′W	Federal	National Park Service	N/A	2012	Natural spring and restored prairie site formerly known as Camp Coldwater, located in the Fort Snelling unorganized territory in Hennepin County.
Coon Rapids Dam Regional Park (East)	865–867.7; 45°8′55″N 93°18′28″W	County	Anoka County Parks	446 acres (180 ha)	1994	Features pedestrians and non-motorized traffic access to the 1913 Coon Rapids Dam, plus river and lake fishing and a visitor center.
Coon Rapids Dam Regional Park (West)	865–867.7; 45°8′41″N 93°19′14″W	Park district	Three Rivers Park District	160 acres (65 ha)	1969	Features pedestrians and non-motorized traffic access to the 1913 Coon Rapids Dam, plus a visitor center.
Crosby Farm Regional Park	842.3–845.4; 44°53′53″N 93°9′47″W	City	St. Paul Parks and Recreation	736 acres (298 ha)	1962	Restored bottomland hardwood forest and wetlands that were farmed from 1858 to 1962. Hiking trails and location of the Watergate Marina.
Father Hennepin Bluffs Park	~853.7; 44°58′54″N 93°14′57″W	City	Minneapolis Park and Recreation Board	8 acres (3.2 ha)	1979	Father Louis Hennepin, the first European to describe St. Anthony Falls, saw them from this site in 1680.
First Bridge Park	~854.4; 44°59′4″N 93°15′52″W	City	Minneapolis Park and Recreation Board	22 acres (8.9 ha)	2001	Interpretive signage and public art beneath the Hennepin Avenue Bridge commemorate the site of the first permanent bridge crossing the Mississippi, built in 1855.
Fort Snelling State Park	843.9; 44°52′15″N 93°11′47″W	State	Minnesota Department of Natural Resources	2,931 acres (1,186 ha)	1961	Includes Pike Island and bottomland hardwood forest at the confluence of the Mississippi and Minnesota Rivers.
Fountain Cave	~841.6; 45°5′20″N 93°16′34″W	N/A	N/A	N/A	N/A	A historical marker shows the former location of a sandstone cave, site of the first building in St. Paul (Pierre Parrant's tavern) and later a tourist attraction. The cave was ruined by sewage and the entrance was sealed in 1960 during road construction.
Gluek Park	~856.2; 45°5′20″N 93°16′34″W	City	Minneapolis Park and Recreation Board	2.9 acres (1.2 ha)	1994	Established on the site of the 1857 Gluek Brewery following its demolition in 1970.
Gold Medal Park	~853.6; 45°5′20″N 93°16′34″W	City	Minneapolis Park and Recreation Board	7.5 acres (3.0 ha)	2007	Selected as the future site of a memorial to the victims of the I-35W Mississippi River bridge collapse.
Grey Cloud Dunes Scientific and Natural Area	821; 44°52′15″N 93°11′47″W	State	Minnesota Department of Natural Resources	237 acres (96 ha)	1998	Preserves a sandy prairie with dunes and blowouts on river terraces.
Grey Cloud Island	821–825; 45°5′20″N 93°16′34″W	City	Grey Cloud Island Township	2,000 acres (810 ha)	N/A	An island named after Grey Cloud Woman, a 19th-century Mdewakanton. The 1846 Grey Cloud Lime Kiln is on the NRHP.
Harriet Island Regional Park	839.5–840.5; 44°53′53″N 93°9′47″W	City	St. Paul Parks and Recreation		1900	Named for educator Harriet Bishop and now connected to shore, this former island has long been the site of public amenities and festivals. The Harriet Island Pavilion is on the NRHP. The regional park boundaries includes Raspberry Island and the Minnesota Boat Club Boathouse that is on the NRHP.
Hidden Falls Regional Park	845.4–847.4; 44°53′53″N 93°9′47″W	City	St. Paul Parks and Recreation	134 acres (54 ha)	1887	One of St. Paul's original parks, designed by Horace Cleveland. Features a spring-fed waterfall in a stone channel built by the Works Progress Administration.
Historic Fort Snelling	845.5; 45°5′20″N 93°16′34″W	State	Minnesota Historical Society			Begun as a wilderness outpost in 1819 at the strategic confluence of the Mississippi and Minnesota Rivers, and staffed by the U.S. Army through World War II, when it served as a major processing center for new servicemen. Now a National Historic Landmark.
Indian Mounds Regional Park	~838; 44°56′48″N 93°3′39″W	City	St. Paul Parks and Recreation	79 acres (32 ha)	1893	Preserves six 2,000-year-old burial mounds from the Hopewell tradition.
Islands of Peace County Park	861; 45°4′35″N 93°16′27″W	County	Anoka County Parks	22 acres (8.9 ha)		Comprises three islands, one connected to the east bank by a bridge, the other two accessible only by water. Part of Riverfront Regional Park.
John H. Stevens House Museum	~847.6; 44°54′50″N 93°12′34″W	City	Minneapolis Park and Recreation Board		1985	Built in 1850, the home of John H. Stevens was the first wood-frame house west of the Mississippi and the political and social hub of the young Minneapolis. Originally near St. Anthony Falls, it has been moved to Minnehaha Park.
Kaposia Indian Site	N/A	N/A	N/A	N/A	c. 1750	A seasonal Mdewakanton Dakota village was situated below present-day Indian Mounds Regional Park until resettlement following the 1853 Treaty of Mendota.
Kaposia Landing	834.8–835.7; 44°54′20″N 93°2′48″W	City	South St. Paul Parks & Recreation	87 acres (35 ha)	2008	Developed over a reclaimed construction landfill. Includes an off-leash dog park.
Kaposia Park	~835.5; 44°54′22″N 93°3′43″W	City	South St. Paul Parks & Recreation	85 acres (34 ha)		Features recreational amenities, including a disc golf course.
Lake Rebecca Park	~814–815; 44°53′53″N 93°9′47″W	City	Hastings Parks and Recreation	215 acres (87 ha)	1995	Formerly called Hastings River Flats Park, and adjacent to Lock and Dam No. 2.
Lambert's Landing	~838.8; 44°56′43″N 93°5′11″W	City	St. Paul Parks and Recreation	0.3 acres (0.12 ha)	1937	Historic site of St. Paul's major steamboat landing, the head of navigation on the Mississippi.
Leonard H. Neiman Sports Complex	~846; 44°53′31″N 93°11′29″W	City	Minneapolis Park and Recreation Board		2003	Public sports fields developed on the extended grounds of Fort Snelling.
Lilydale Regional Park	841.3–843; 44°55′1″N 93°7′30″W	City	St. Paul Parks and Recreation	384 acres (155 ha)	1971	A former townsite now reverted to floodplain forest.
Lock and Dam No. 1	847.6; 44°55′11″N 93°12′14″W	Federal	U.S. Army Corps of Engineers	N/A	1917	Tours are offered of the lock and dam that extended the head of navigation to Minneapolis.
Lock and Dam No. 2	815.2; 44°45′33″N 92°52′9″W	Federal	U.S. Army Corps of Engineers	N/A	1930	Visitors can watch from an observation deck as river traffic passes through this lock adjacent to Hastings.
Longfellow House Hospitality Center	~847.8; 44°54′57″N 93°12′49″W	City	Minneapolis Park and Recreation Board		2001	Built in 1907, this 2/3 scale replica of Henry Wadsworth Longfellow's house in Massachusetts now serves as the information center for Minnehaha Park and the Grand Rounds Scenic Byway.
Manomin County Park	862; 45°5′20″N 93°16′34″W	County	Anoka County Parks	15 acres (6.1 ha)	1967	Includes the mouth of Rice Creek and the historic Banfill Tavern, now an art center. Named for the former Manomin County.
Marshall Terrace Park	~856.7; 45°1′4″N 93°16′20″W	City	Minneapolis Park and Recreation Board	6.5 acres (2.6 ha)	1914	Offers recreational amenities in a quiet neighborhood park.
Meeker Island Lock and Dam Historic Site	850.2; 44°57′14″N 93°12′24″W	City	St. Paul Parks and Recreation		2007	The first lock and dam on the Mississippi only operated from 1907 to 1912, when it was submerged by Lock and Dam No. 1. The NRHP-listed remnants are visible from a riverside path during low water.
Mill City Museum	~853.8; 44°58′43″N 93°15′25″W	State	Minnesota Historical Society		2003	Features exhibits on the milling history of Minneapolis, within the ruins of the Washburn A Mill, a National Historic Landmark built in 1880.
Mill Ruins Park	~853.9; 44°58′49″N 93°15′29″W	City	Minneapolis Park and Recreation Board		2001	Contains the excavated remains of the tailraces and canals that powered the 19th Century milling industry that spurred the development of Minneapolis.
Minnehaha Regional Park	847–847.6; 44°54′44″N 93°12′36″W	City	Minneapolis Park and Recreation Board	193 acres (78 ha)	1889	Surrounds Minnehaha Falls and contains several sculptures and historic structures.
Minnesota Valley National Wildlife Refuge	N/A; 44°51′35″N 93°12′59″W	Federal	U.S. Fish and Wildlife Service	14,000 acres (5,700 ha)	1976	Several units strung along the lower Minnesota River provide natural habitat and outdoor recreation.
Mississippi Gorge Regional Park	~848–852; 44°56′10″N 93°12′2″W	City	Minneapolis Park and Recreation Board, St. Paul Parks and Recreation			Provides hiking and biking paths along the only gorge on the Mississippi.
Mississippi River Visitor Center	839.7; 44°56′34″N 93°5′55″W	Federal	National Park Service	2,000 square feet (190 m^{2})	2003	MNRRA's main visitor center, located in the lobby of the Science Museum of Minnesota.
Nicollet Island Park	~854.5; 44°59′10″N 93°15′37″W	City	Minneapolis Park and Recreation Board	26.8 acres (10.8 ha)	1946	Located on historic Nicollet Island, with a rental facility in a renovated 1893 factory and views of the 1858 dam above St. Anthony Falls.
North Mississippi Regional Park	858–860.5; 45°2′37″N 93°16′58″W	City	Minneapolis Park and Recreation Board	67.2 acres (27.2 ha)	1954	Features a visitor center operated by Three Rivers Park District.
Oheyawahi-Pilot Knob	~845.3; 44°52′51″N 93°10′2″W	County	Dakota County Parks	25 acres (10 ha)		A landmark to the Dakota and early settlers, this hill overlooks the confluence of the Mississippi and Minnesota Rivers.
Peninsula Point Two Rivers Historical Park	~871.5; 45°11′35″N 93°23′38″W	City	City of Anoka Parks & Recreation	8.3 acres (3.4 ha)	1995	Features interpretive signage, park amenities, and a state champion green ash tree at the mouth of the Rum River.
Pine Bend Bluff Scientific and Natural Area	~825.3; 44°47′17″N 93°2′3″W	State	Minnesota Department of Natural Resources	256 acres (104 ha)		Oak forests and dry prairies on these 200-foot (61 m) bluffs form one of the largest undisturbed natural areas in the Minneapolis–St. Paul metropolitan area.
River Warren Falls	N/A	N/A	N/A	N/A	11,700 – 9,400 years ago	A massive prehistoric waterfall on the Glacial River Warren slowly eroded upstream, carving the Mississippi Gorge and ultimately devolving into St. Anthony Falls and Minnehaha Falls.
Riverfront Regional Park	859–860.5; 45°3′39″N 93°16′53″W	County	Anoka County Parks	139 acres (56 ha)	1987	Features riverfront paths and a rental facility in a renovated 1880s farmhouse.
Riverside Park	~852; 44°57′55″N 93°13′52″W	City	Minneapolis Park and Recreation Board	40 acres (16 ha)	1884	Site of several firsts in Minneapolis park amenities, from the first playground and basketball court in the 1900s to a full-sized soccer field and an off-leash dog park in recent years.
Science Museum of Minnesota	839.7; 44°56′35″N 93°5′53″W	Non-profit	Science Museum of Minnesota	370,000 square feet (34,000 m^{2})	1999	A museum providing exhibits, education, and research on natural sciences, technology, and culture. The MNRRA visitor center is located in the lobby.
Sibley House Historic Site	~845; 44°53′15″N 93°10′0″W	State	Minnesota Historical Society		1910	The site includes the 1838 home of fur-trader turned first state governor Henry Hastings Sibley (the oldest European house in Minnesota), the 1840 home of trader Jean-Baptiste Faribault, and an 1843 American Fur Company store.
Spring Lake Park Reserve	815.2–823; 44°44′44″N 92°58′0″W; 44°45′49″N 92°55′53″W	County	Dakota County Parks	1,200 acres (490 ha)		Two separate units overlook a spring-fed lake joined to the Mississippi by dam-raised water levels. Amenities include an archery trail, community garden plots, model airplane field, and several rental facilities.
St. Anthony Falls	854; 44°58′54″N 93°15′26″W	Federal	U.S. Army Corps of Engineers	N/A	1937	The only waterfall on the entire Mississippi powered a major milling district from the 1860s to the 1930s. In 1937 the falls were about to erode into rapids and were stabilized with a concrete spillway.
St. Croix National Scenic Riverway	811.5; 45°25′1″N 92°38′46″W	Federal	National Park Service	92,738 acres (37,530 ha)	1968	A tributary of the Mississippi, the largely undeveloped St. Croix River on the Wisconsin–Minnesota border is protected as a separate unit of the National Park system.
Stone Arch Bridge	853.9; 44°58′50″N 93°15′11″W	City	Minneapolis Park and Recreation Board	58,000 square feet (5,400 m^{2})	1994	Built in 1883 for James J. Hill's Great Northern Railway, this 2,100-foot-long (640 m) Historic Civil Engineering Landmark was converted to a walking and biking path in 1994.
Upper St. Anthony Falls Lock and Dam	854; 44°58′50″N 93°15′28″W	Federal	U.S. Army Corps of Engineers	N/A	1963	Free tours are offered of the facility that finally extended navigation above St. Anthony Falls.
Vento View Overlook	~841.6; 44°55′3″N 93°6′48″W	City	St. Paul Parks and Recreation	N/A	2001	Congressman Bruce Vento, a dedicated environmental advocate, is honored at this river valley overlook . Part of Cherokee Regional Park.
Vermillion River Bottoms	795.5	State	Minnesota Department of Natural Resources			The lower Vermillion River flows through floodplain forest before emptying into the Mississippi.
Water Power Park	~853.8; 44°59′3″N 93°15′17″W	City	Minneapolis Park and Recreation Board	1.4 acres (0.57 ha)	2007	Interprets the country's first commercial hydroelectric power plant.
Winchell Trail	44°56′35.87″N 93°12′9.87″W	City	Minneapolis Park and Recreation Board	N/A	1914	5 mi (8 km) hiking trail off the West River Parkway in Minneapolis.

== See also ==
- Geography of Minnesota
- List of areas in the United States National Park System
- Saint Croix National Scenic Riverway
