= North Mississippi Regional Park =

Coordinates: 45°2′37″N 93°16′58″W

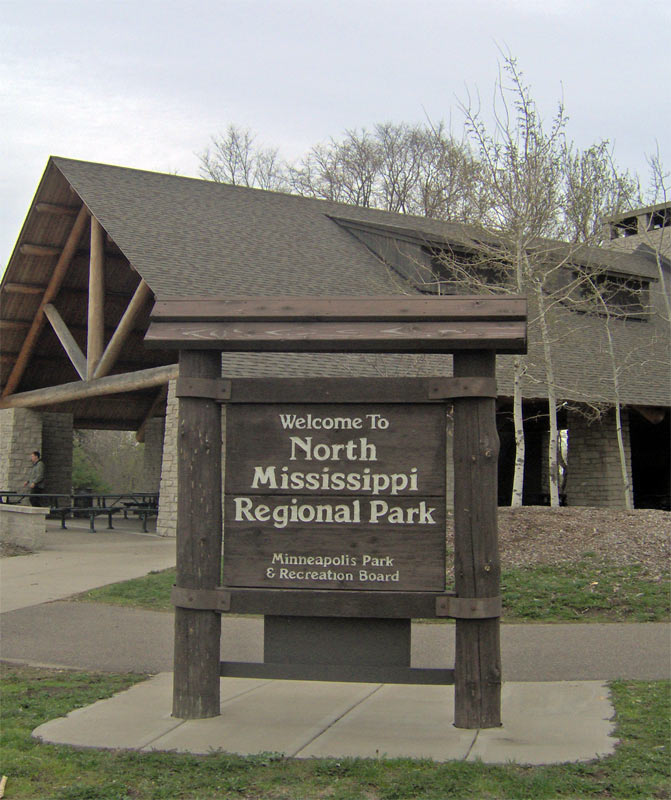
North Mississippi Regional Park

North Mississippi Regional Park is a joint effort of the Minneapolis Park and Recreation Board and the Three Rivers Park District and lies within the larger Mississippi National River and Recreation Area. The park, located near the northern border of the Camden Industrial Area of Minneapolis, Minneapolis, borders the western shore of the Mississippi River. Connected to the Grand Rounds Scenic Byway through biking trails, it ties the Anoka County park system to the parkways of Minneapolis.

Its intimate enclosed natural setting in the middle of a highly metropolitan area makes the park very attractive to a wide array of people. The park is a great place for people to bask with friends and family in the spring, summer or fall. Wild animals such as deer, fox and badgers can be found along the banks and are seen in late fall. Great blue herons nest in the island trees along the banks.

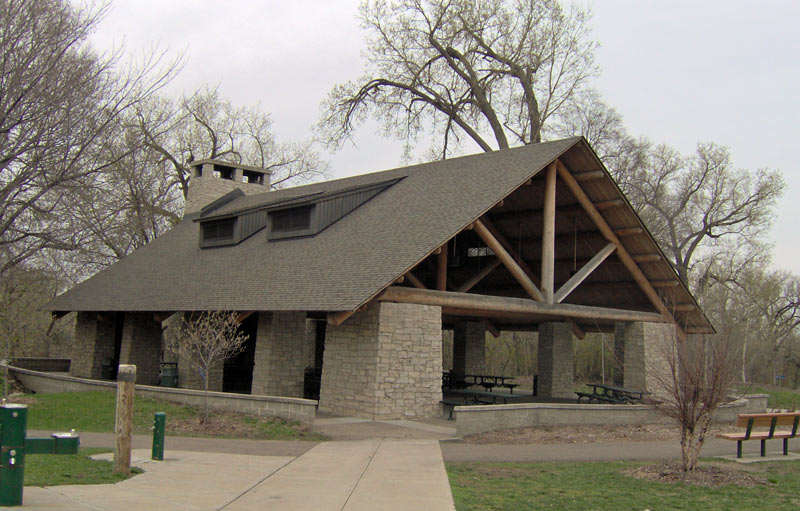
Pavilion at North Mississippi Regional Park

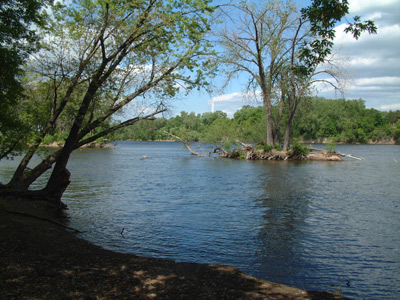
A view of the Mississippi River from the park.

== Amenities ==
- Fishing
- Biking
- Picnic area/pavilion
- Wading pool/playground
- Carl Kroening Interpretive Center
- Boat launch
