= Crosby Farm =

Park and historic site in Saint Paul, Minnesota, United States

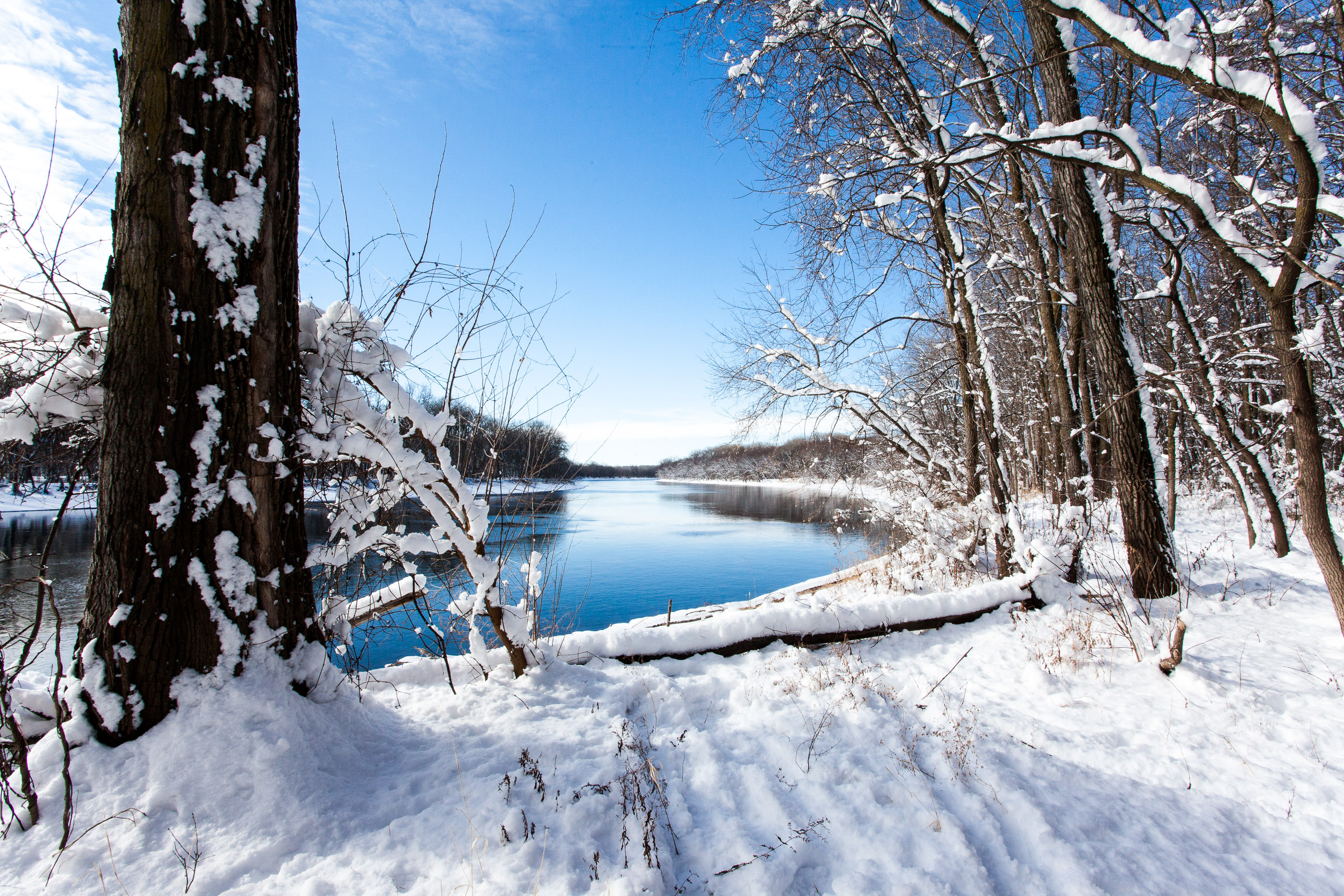
- Crosby Farm, February 2016
- Interactive map of Crosby Farm
- Type: Natural park
- Location: Saint Paul, Minnesota, United States
- Coordinates: 44.909285°N 93.145925°W
- Area: 534 acres (2.16 km^{2})
- Created: 1887
- Status: Open all year
- Website: Crosby Farm Regional Park

Crosby Farm is a regional park in Saint Paul, Minnesota, United States, in the floodplain forests along the Mississippi River. It is named after a farmstead Thomas Crosby owned from 1858 to 1886. Crosby Farm Regional Park is maintained by the City of Saint Paul and is within the Mississippi National River and Recreation Area.

== History ==
Thomas Crosby acquired the original, 160-acre (0.65 km^{2}) farm in 1858 at the West End/Highland Park area of Saint Paul and farmed it until his death in 1886. A succession of other families owned the farm over the following decades. In the 1960s, the Saint Paul Port Authority acquired the land and leased it as parkland to the City of Saint Paul.

== Regional park ==
The 534-acre (2.16 km^{2}), contiguous Hidden Falls and Crosby Farm regional parks are Saint Paul's largest natural park. Crosby Farm park protects the floodplain forest along the Mississippi River corridor's north bank, the dense oak forest adjacent to the river bluff, and several wetlands and small lakes, including Crosby Lake and Upper Lake.

== Recreation ==
Crosby Farm Regional Park includes 6.7 miles (10.8 km) of paved trails for hiking and cycling that connect it to the Watergate Marina and Hidden Falls Regional Park. Popular activities include picnicking, hiking, boating, fishing, cycling, and cross-country skiing.

== See also ==
- History of Saint Paul, Minnesota
- Upper Mississippi River
