= Indian Mounds Regional Park (Saint Paul, Minnesota) =

Park in Minnesota, United States

Wicaḣapi
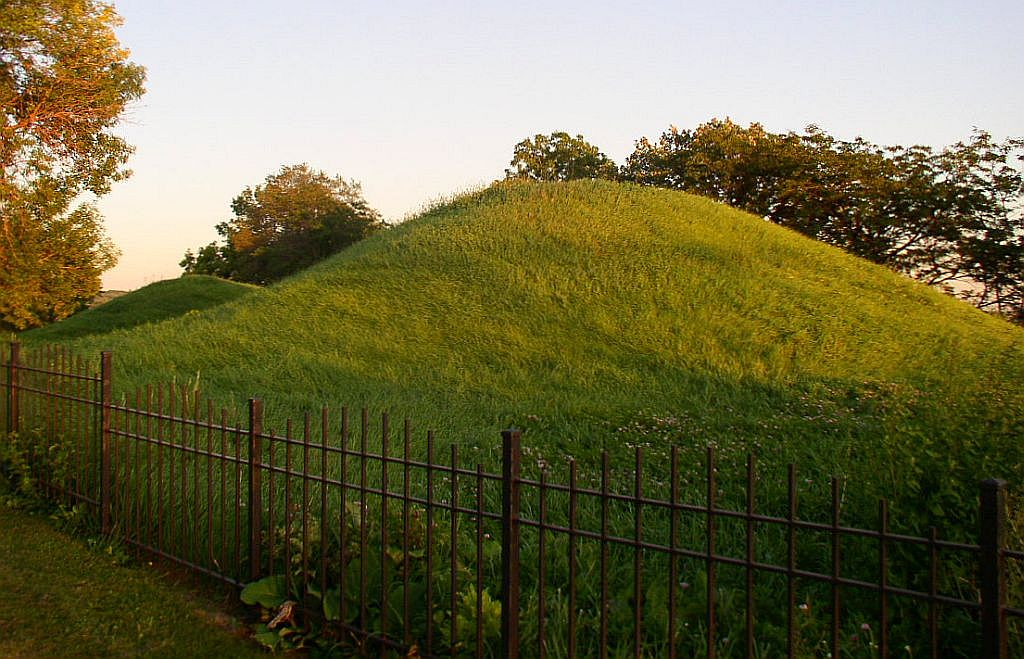
- Two Indigenous burial mounds at this park.

- Location within Minnesota Location within the United States
- Location: Saint Paul, Minnesota, United States
- Coordinates: 44°56′44″N 93°3′13″W
- Area: 79 acres (32 ha)
- Elevation: 876 ft (267 m)
- Established: 1893
- Governing body: Saint Paul Parks and Recreation

- Indian Mounds Park Mound Group
- U.S. National Register of Historic Places
- U.S. Historic district
- Location: 1075 Mounds Boulevard, Saint Paul, Minnesota
- Coordinates: 44°56′45″N 93°3′24″W
- Area: 3.6 acres (1.5 ha)
- Built: c. 1000 BCE–1837
- NRHP reference No.: 14000140
- Added to NRHP: April 11, 2014

Wicaḣapi (previously named Indian Mounds Regional Park) is a public park in Saint Paul, Minnesota, United States, featuring six burial mounds overlooking the Mississippi River. The oldest mounds were constructed about 2,500 years ago by local Indigenous people linked to the Archaic period, who may have been inspired by the burial style known as the Hopewell Tradition. Mdewakanton Dakota people are also known to have interred their dead here well into that period. At least 31 mounds were destroyed by development in the late 19th century. This burial mound group includes the tallest mounds constructed by people Indigenous to Minnesota and Wisconsin (except for the unique 45-foot (14 m) Grand Mound outside International Falls, Minnesota). Wicaḣapi is a component of the Mississippi National River and Recreation Area, a unit of the National Park System. In 2014, the extant Mounds Group was listed in the National Register of Historic Places. The nomination document describes the archaeology and context. A Cultural Landscape Study provides more context about the cultural landscape.

== Early history ==
There were once at least 19 mounds at the intact group, plus another 32 a short distance to the northwest directly above Carver's Cave, known as Wakan Tipi (Sacred Home or Tipi) in the Dakota language and considered a sacred place by the Dakota, Ho-Chunk, and Ioway nations. The mounds of the second, Dayton's Bluff Group were all quite small, under two feet (0.6 m) high. In 1957, Eldon Johnson linked archeological information taken from the cemetery in the late 19th century to the burial styles of the Hopewell Burial Tradition, but the closest cultural affiliations are to people indigenous to this area, and there has never been a cultural group of Hopewell people in Minnesota. No evidence of habitation has been found among the mounds. Typically, burial mounds and scaffolds were built on high locations in sight of related nearby villages that were near fresh water. In this case, the historic Dakota village Kaposia, which was near Pig's Eye Lake, is closely linked to the cemetery. The Dakota village of Kaposia was established well before 1600 and in 1766 explorer Jonathan Carver noted that a Dakota leader was buried at this place at that time.

== Survey and excavation ==
Edward Duffield Neill first excavated the mounds in 1856. In 1862, Alfred Hill and William Wallace, members of the Archaeological Committee of the Minnesota Historical Society, documented 21 mound locations at the northwestern "Dayton's Bluff" group and 16 or 17 at the Indian Mounds Park Group. This survey was followed by amateur Antiquarian excavations sponsored in 1886 and 1867 that involved trenching the mounds. The mounds are so large that intrusive excavations often consisted of less than 5% of mound volume. In 1879, Theodore H. Lewis surveyed the mound group again, adding some mound locations. The mound groups had a variety of burial styles. At least three mounds were built around log tombs, and two contained multiple cists made of limestone slabs. Grave goods included mussel shells in the simplest and most common burials, and projectile points, perforated bear teeth, and copper ornaments in others. One burial contained a child's skull with unfired clay pressed onto it, perhaps in an apparent recreation of the child's features. No other such so-called death masks have been documented in local contemporaneous Native American burials. Human remains in funeral bundles found in the upper parts of some mounds have been interpreted as secondary burials from more recent periods.

The early Antiquarian archeologists exhumed around 20 mostly complete skeletons (though many were missing their skulls) and fragments of perhaps another 30, but they did not screen soil and noted that they returned skeletal remains to their backfilled trenches. Excavations only affected small fractions of the mound centers, so the actual number of people buried here is unknown.

These 19th-century archeologists, "some of them amateurs in their day, all of them amateurs by today's standards", may have destroyed as much information as they preserved. Lewis was a sophisticated surveyor for his time, but worked hastily—once excavating seven mounds in a day—and did not describe his finds in detail. Most of the artifacts he collected were sold and have since been lost. But reexamination of stone tools Lewis found in association with the stone cists, which are still held by the Minnesota Historical Society, show that they were made of local materials and date to the Late Archaic period, placing the first burials at this cemetery at least 2,500 years ago, when mound burials were not typically made in this region.

In the late 19th century, the bluff-face was gradually demolished to widen the rail yard at its foot, destroying several mounds as well as the outer chamber of Carver's Cave. In a time "when digging into a mound was a respectable Sunday pastime", locals also repeatedly looted and vandalized the mounds.

The Minnesota Historical Society performed a modern archeological field survey of the mound site in 1981. Christina Harrison conducted excavations under the Air Mail beacon in 1994. Geophysical surveys by Archaeo-Physics in 2012 supported the National Register Nomination.

== Park development ==
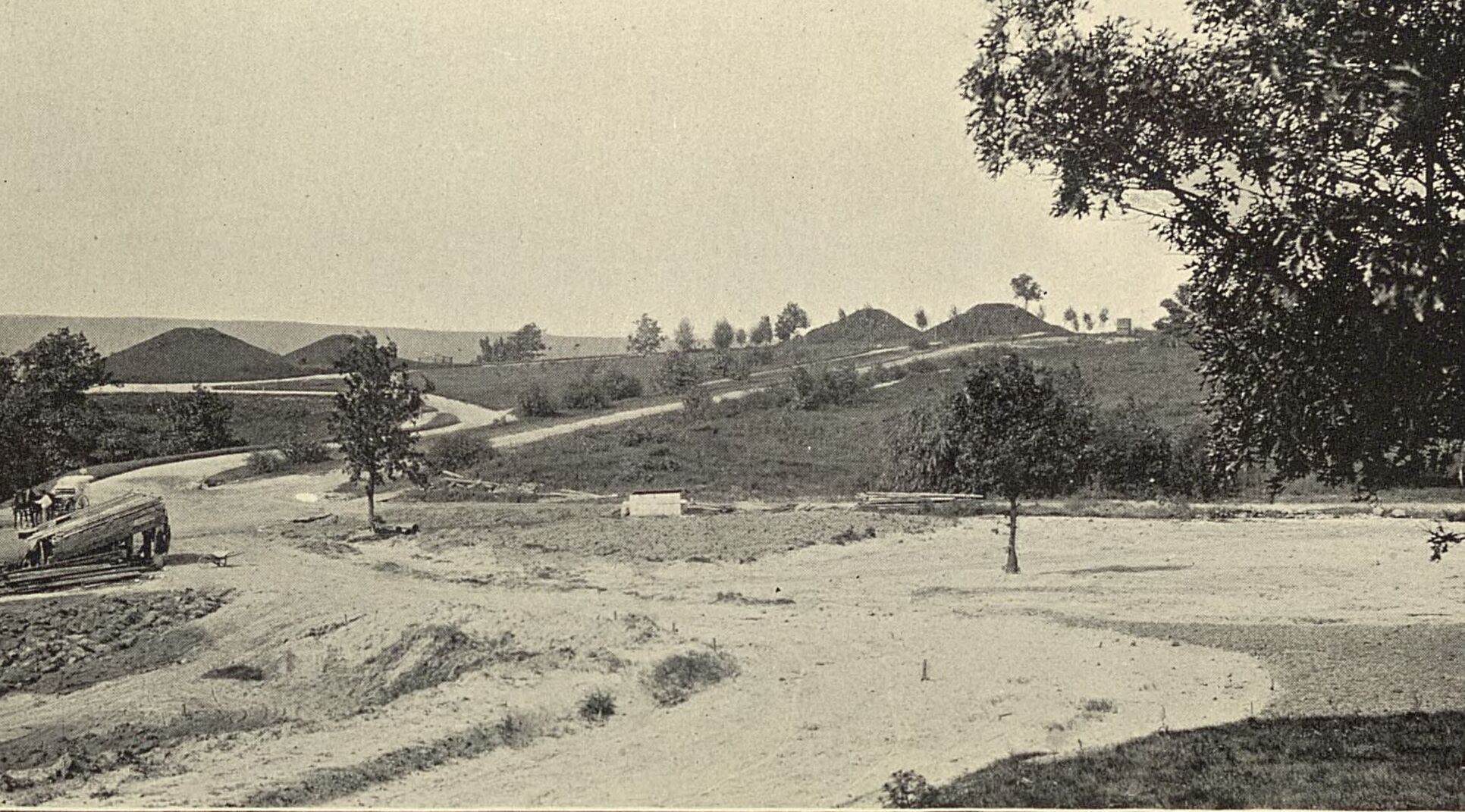
View of Wicaḣapi ca. 1898

Interest in preserving the open land along the blufftop arose in the 1880s as the local population boomed. The City of Saint Paul struggled to buy the land from its various owners, as some were unwilling to sell and others sold to real estate speculators first. By 1896, enough property was assembled for the city to begin landscaping and building visitor amenities. In sharp contrast to modern practices, 11 mounds were leveled because they blocked the view of the river. Only the six largest mounds remained.

The park was expanded to 82 acres (33 ha) in 1900. Later, paths were removed from mounds and soil added to damaged areas, and in 1914 a still-standing brick pavilion was built to house a refreshment stand, restrooms, and space for open-air concerts.

Wicaḣapi underwent a major restoration in the 1980s using state and federal funds for developing the Great River Road. The pavilion was restored, new amenities added, and houses and a road were removed. The Dayton's Bluff Community Council raised funds and placed decorative fences around the mounds as a protection from visitors.

== Airway beacon ==
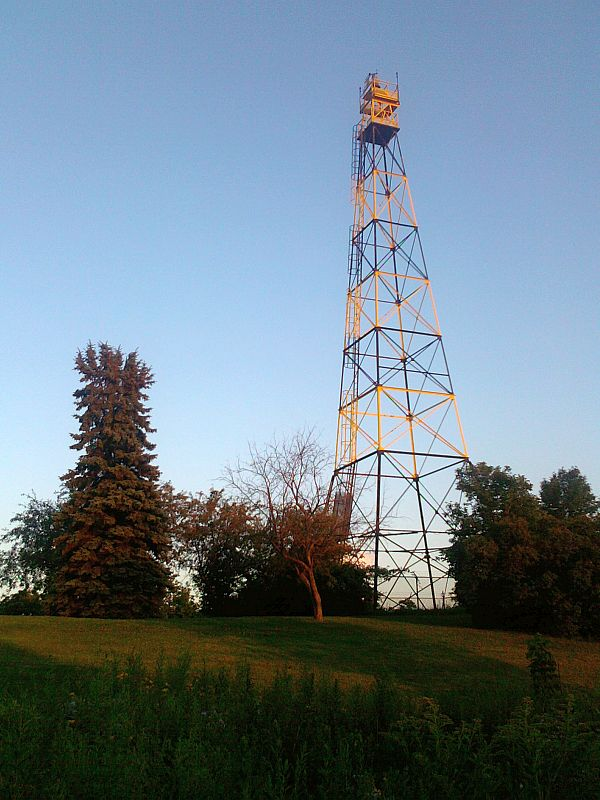
The Indian Mounds Park "Airway" Beacon

Adjacent to the mounds is a 110-foot-high (34 m) airway beacon built in 1929 as part of a national network to aid pilots delivering airmail. The Wicaḣapi "Airway" Beacon, as it is officially known, helped mark the route between Saint Paul and Chicago. There were once over 600 of these beacons, but electronic navigation systems rendered them obsolete. Restored to its historical black and chrome-yellow color scheme in the mid-1990s, the Wicaḣapi beacon has been kept operational and flashes its rotating light every five seconds. It is one of the few remaining airway beacons in the U.S.

== Recreation ==
Wicaḣapi has two electrified picnic shelters that private groups can rent. Other visitor amenities include a playground, barbecue grills, fire rings, restrooms, a drinking fountain, paved trails, a ball field, and tennis courts.

== See also ==
- Native American Graves Protection and Repatriation Act
- Bruce Vento Nature Sanctuary
- List of Hopewell sites
- List of burial mounds in the United States
- Mississippi National River and Recreation Area
- National Register of Historic Places listings in Ramsey County, Minnesota
