= Hidden Falls (Saint Paul, Minnesota) =

Park and hiking area in Minnesota, United States

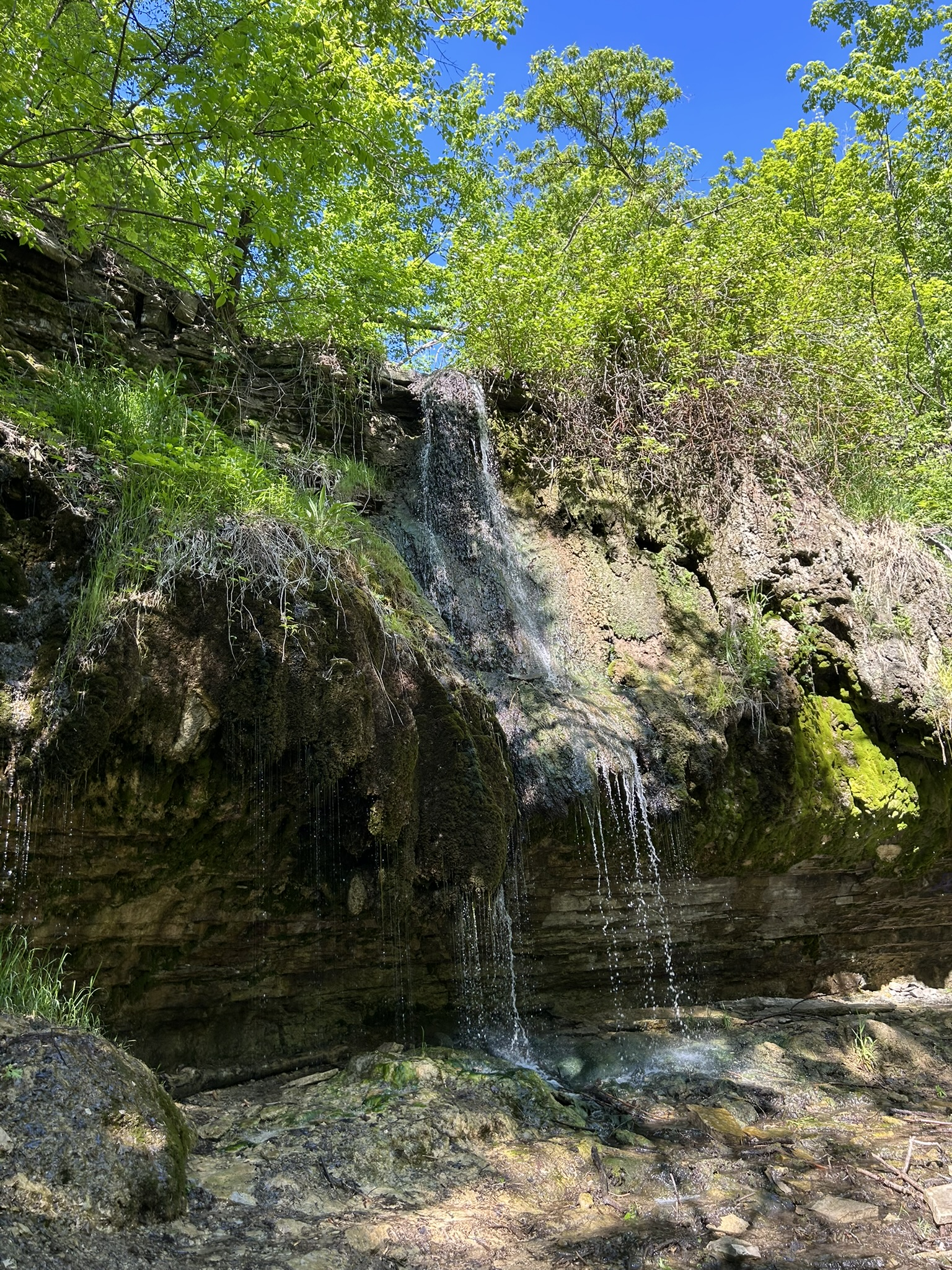
- Hidden Falls in May 2026
- Interactive map of Hidden Falls
- Type: Urban park
- Location: Saint Paul, Minnesota, United States
- Coordinates: 44.90968°N 93.19233°W
- Created: 1887
- Status: Open all year
- Website: Hidden Falls Regional Park

Hidden Falls is a waterfall along the Mississippi River bluffs in Saint Paul, Minnesota, United States. The waterfall is within Hidden Falls Regional Park, a public park maintained by the City of Saint Paul. The main feature of the park is the small, spring-fed waterfall for which the park is named. The waterfall may be dry in periods of limited precipitation.

== History ==
Maps from the early 19th century label the park area as Rum Town and Lebanon Grove.

The area of park was selected by Horace Cleveland in 1887 to be one of Saint Paul's main parks. The actual development of the area as a park was by the Works Progress Administration 1936–1937, including construction of a limestone staircase leading from the base of the falls up to East River Parkway. In the 1960s, redevelopment of the park resulted in four main areas: nature preserve, boat launch, picnic site, and scenic falls. Hidden Falls Regional Park lies within the Mississippi National River and Recreation Area and is maintained by the City of Saint Paul.

=== Waterfall ===
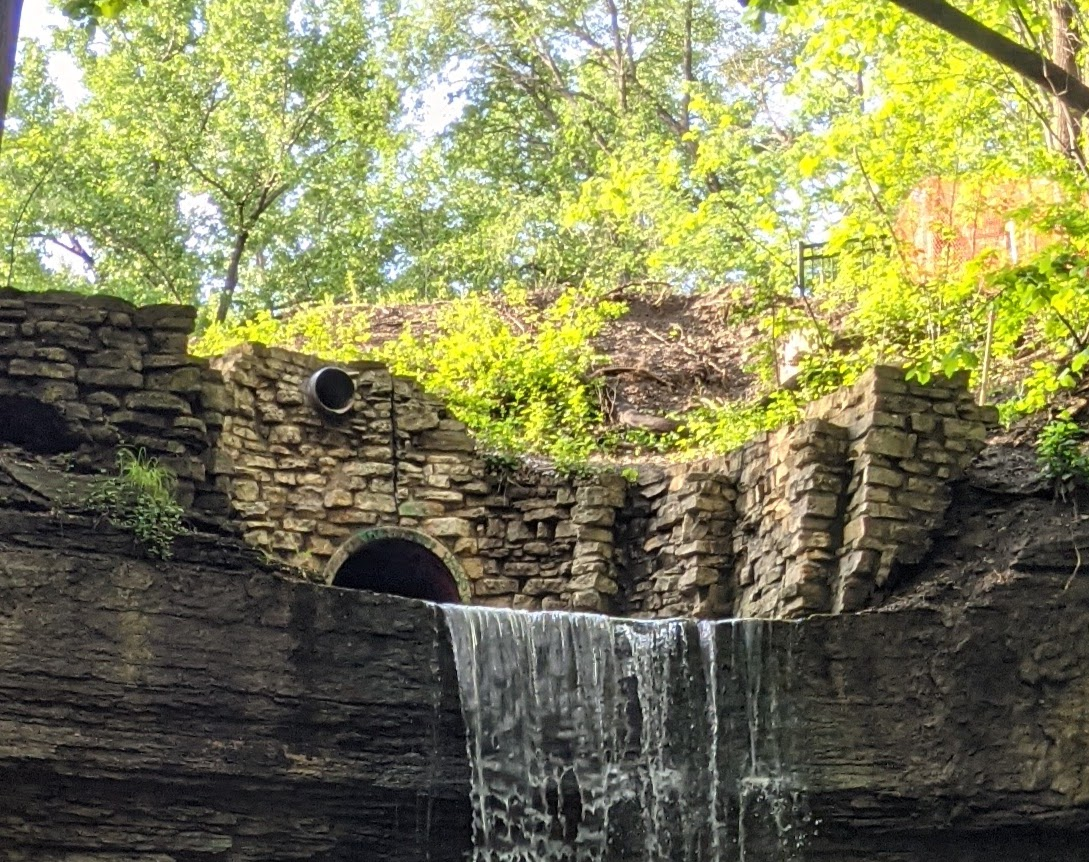
Storm sewer opening and falls. Rain runoff provides water for Hidden Falls as of 2021

Hidden Falls Regional Park describes the falls as "spring-fed", but when precipitation is scarce the falls become dry. According to the Star Tribune, as of 2021 the fall's water comes from stormwater drain pipes.

More than a century ago, a stream in St. Paul's Highland Park carried stormwater from higher ground over Hidden Falls ... after Henry Ford's factory was built early in the 20th century, stormwater was ingloriously routed through buried pipes to pour untreated and unwatched into the river.

Ford's Twin Cities Assembly Plant closed in 2011, and in the 2020s, the site's redevelopment was set to include a restoration of the area's watershed, with plans for more consistent waterflows over the falls and a filtration of pollutants from the water.

The falls is about a mile southeast (as the crow flies) across the Mississippi River from Minnehaha Falls, another, larger falls that also empties into the river.

== Recreation ==
Hidden Falls Regional Park includes 6.7 miles (10.8 km) of paved trails for hiking and cycling. It is popular for bicycling and walking, picnicking and grilling, boating, bird watching, and fishing. There are two entrances from Mississippi Boulevard to the park, about a mile apart. The two areas are connected inside the park by a biking/hiking trail that also connects the park to the Watergate Marina and Crosby Farm Regional Park downstream to the east.

== See also ==
- History of Saint Paul, Minnesota
- Upper Mississippi River
