= Shoe Tree (Minnesota) =

Tree in Minnesota, United States

Coordinates: 44°58′21″N 93°14′30″W

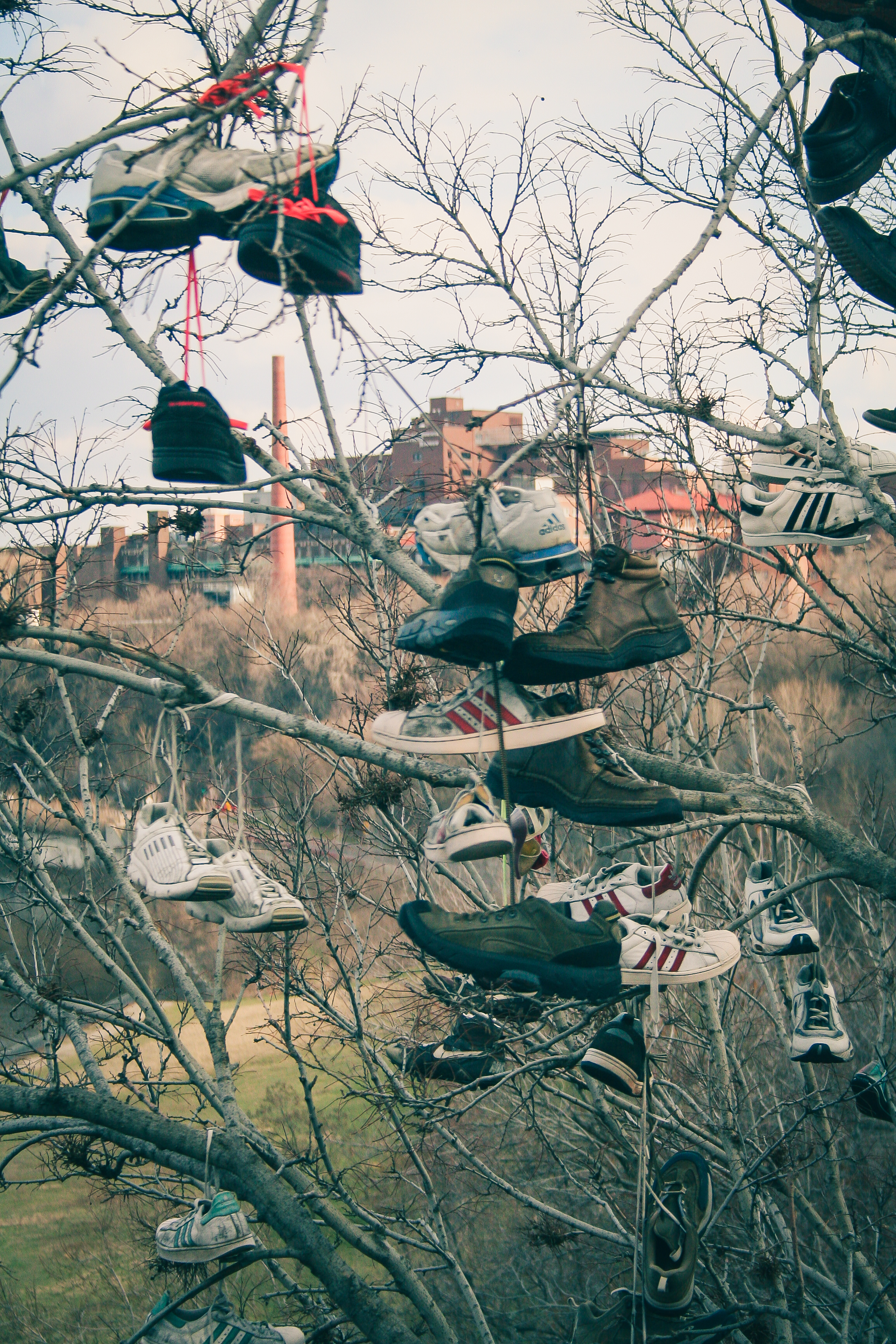
Shoes hanging from the Shoe Tree in 2007

The Shoe Tree is a large common hackberry (Celtis occidentalis) tree next to the Washington Avenue Bridge of the University of Minnesota (UMN) campus in Minneapolis, Minnesota, United States, on the west bank of the Mississippi River. Many students have thrown pairs of shoes onto the tree's branches; it is not clear why they have done so, and sources have offered only speculation.

== Description ==
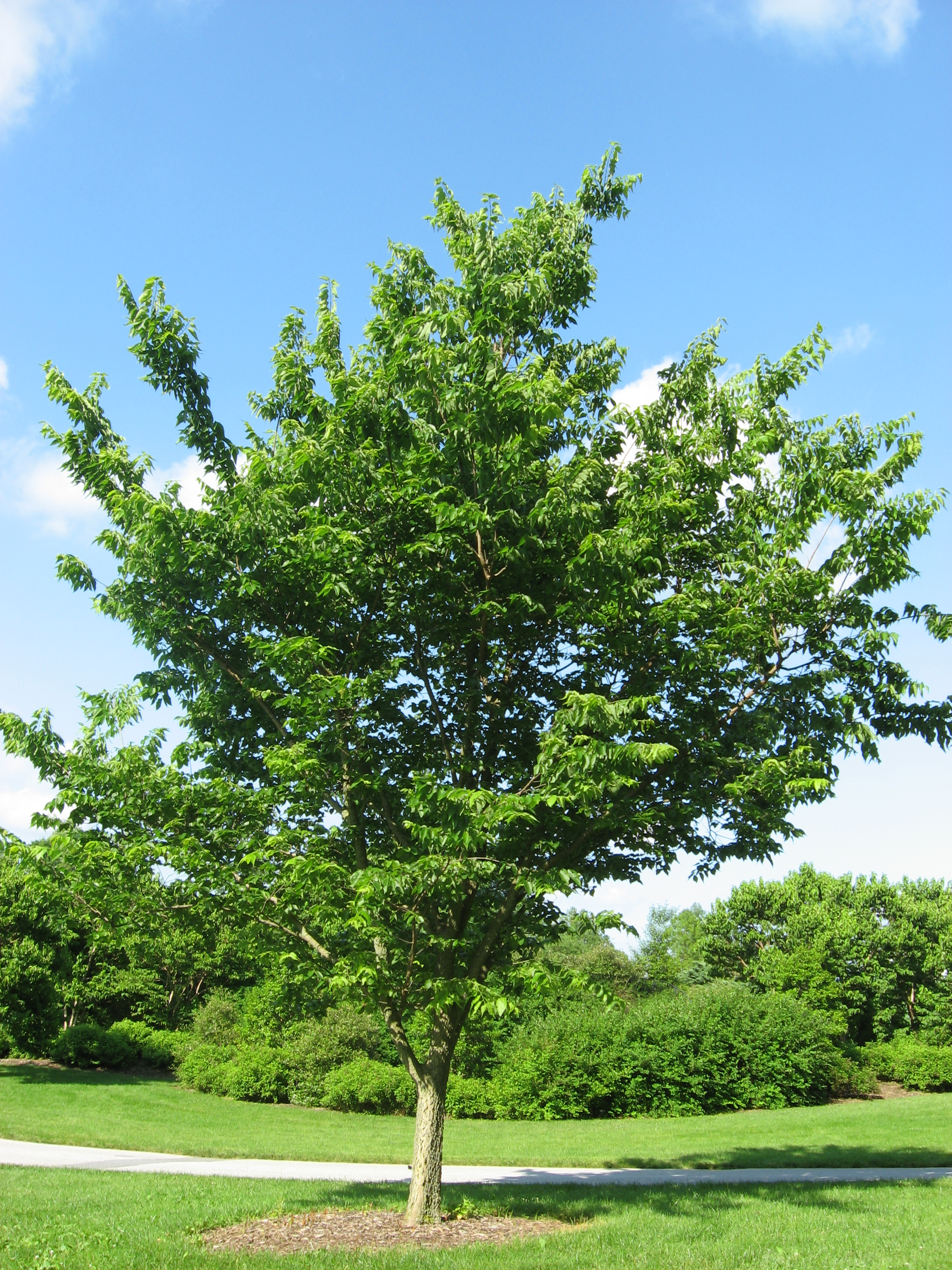
Another Celtis occidentalis tree

The Shoe Tree is a Celtis occidentalis tree, also referred to as the common hackberry. The tree is located in Bohemian Flats Park, which is a part of Mississippi Gorge Regional Park in Minneapolis, Minnesota, giving the Minneapolis Park and Recreation Board jurisdiction for its maintenance. It is located on the west bank of the Mississippi River, with its canopy reaching to the Washington Avenue Bridge on the UMN campus.

== Shoe-throwing ==
The tree's proximity to the bridge allows students to throw pairs of shoes onto it, tangling their laces around its branches. Many of these shoes have inscriptions on their soles, such as UMN's slogan, Ski-U-Mah. As of 2021, this shoe tree is believed to be the only one in Minnesota.

The Washington Avenue Bridge was rebuilt at its current location in 1965, making it unlikely the shoe-throwing tradition occurred before then, although it is unclear when exactly the tradition began. Media coverage of the tree dates back to at least 1995 in the Minnesota Daily, and the tree gained further recognition in the 2000s.

University leaders and community members have shared extensive speculation regarding why students throw shoes onto the tree. Some suggestions have included students throwing their shoes onto the tree to celebrate their graduation, or students throwing their shoes when they first have sexual intercourse. Other theories are that students throw their shoes in hopes of good luck for their exams, or that they do so in celebration of passing their exams. Further speculation is that students throw shoes onto the tree as copycats, not necessarily having another reason for doing so.

== See also ==
- List of individual trees
