= Bruininks Hall =

Academic building at the University of Minnesota

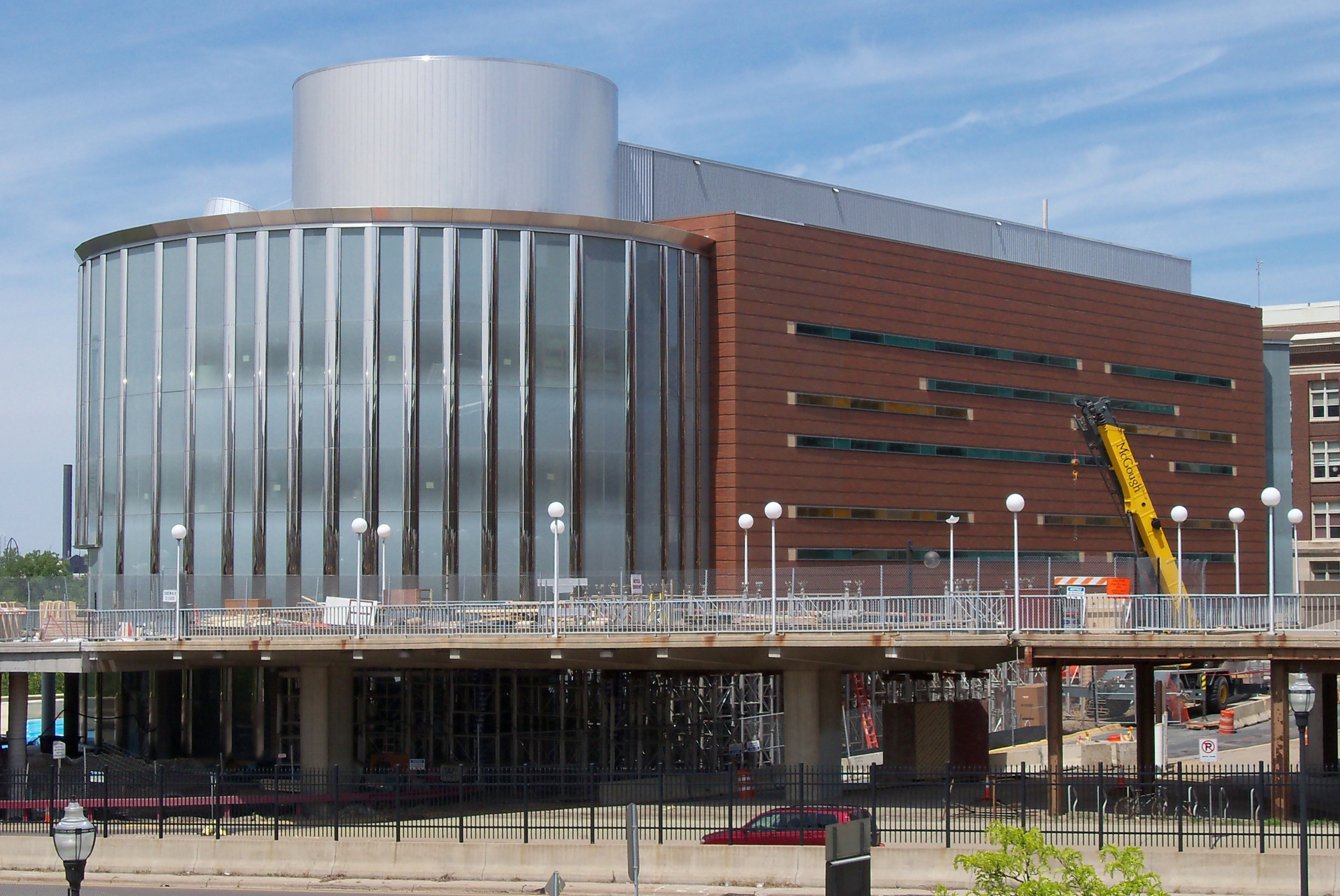
- Construction of the building in May 2010
- Interactive map of the Bruininks Hall area
- Former names: Science Teaching and Student Services Center

General information
- Status: Completed
- Location: University of Minnesota, 222 Pleasant Street SE, Minneapolis, Minnesota, United States
- Coordinates: 44.974109°N 93.237291°W
- Construction started: January 2009
- Completed: August 2010
- Opened: August 24, 2010

Technical details
- Floor count: 5
- Floor area: 115,000 sq ft (10,700 m^{2})

Design and construction
- Architecture firm: Hammel, Green and Abrahamson; Kohn Pedersen Fox

Website
- campusmaps.umn.edu/robert-h-bruininks-hall

Bruininks Hall (/bruːnɪks/ BROO-nihks), formerly the Science Teaching and Student Services (STSS) building, is an academic and student support building at the University of Minnesota. Completed in 2010, it is located next to the Washington Avenue Bridge and holds a variety of classrooms (including ten active-learning rooms) and university-wide student services office.

== History ==
The Science Teaching and Student Services (STSS) building is located at the site of the University of Minnesota's former Science Classroom Building, which Robert McMaster, the university's vice provost and dean of undergraduate education at the time, had called "a decrepit old structure that had sat [at that location] for decades." Construction began on the STSS building in January 2009. It was completed in August 2010 and dedicated on August 24.

On December 12, 2014, the University of Minnesota Board of Regents approved renaming the STSS building to Robert H. Bruininks Hall after Robert Bruininks, the 15th president of the university. A dedication ceremony was held for this renaming on May 1, 2015.

== Classrooms and offices ==
Bruininks Hall is known for its ten active-learning classrooms, which are based on the SCALE-UP model developed at North Carolina State University. It is one of the largest collections of such classrooms in the country. Each classroom consists of a central teaching station and 3 to 14 nine-student tables. Each student table is round and has laptop connections, a large LCD screen, a whiteboard, and microphones. The teaching station has technology controls and access to large projection screens visible to all students. Professors have praised the design of these classrooms, with Professor Robin Wright, former associate dean of the College of Biological Sciences saying, "I really credit this room to making me a better teacher."

In addition to these active-learning classrooms, Bruininks Hall also features five multipurpose classrooms, two lecture halls, and several offices for university-wide student services. The offices in Bruininks Hall include career services, veterans services, and financial aid.

== Architecture and location ==
Hammel, Green and Abrahamson worked with Kohn Pedersen Fox to design the STSS building. It holds five levels and 115,000 square feet (10,700 m^{2}) of floor space. Due to its central location and heavy usage, it was designed to handle significant pedestrian traffic in and around the building.

The building was also designed with efficiency in mind, using under-floor air distribution to conserve space and energy-saving features such as natural lighting, energy recovery, and high-efficiency lighting systems. Because of these considerations, the building is certified with LEED Gold status. Its construction also significantly used recycled materials, including by reusing the foundation of the previous building at its location.

Bruininks Hall overlooks the Mississippi River and is located next to the Washington Avenue Bridge, which connects the East Bank and West Bank portions of the University of Minnesota campus.
