= Little Bohemia =

Little Bohemia may refer to:

== Bohemian (Czech) neighborhoods ==
- Little Bohemia (Baltimore, Maryland)
- Little Bohemia (Omaha, Nebraska)
- Bohemian Flats, or Little Bohemia, neighborhood in Minneapolis, Minnesota

== Other ==
- West Village, or Little Bohemia, neighborhood in Manhattan, New York City
- Little Bohemia Lodge, a resort and restaurant in Manitowish Waters, Wisconsin, where criminal John Dillinger was in a gunfight with federal agents
