= Shoe tree =

A shoe tree may refer to:

- Shoe tree (decorated plant), a perennial woody plant decorated with pairs of hung shoes
  - Shoe Tree (Minnesota), A shoe tree in Minneapolis, Minnesota
- Shoe tree (device), a device placed inside of a shoe to preserve its shape
