= Mississippi Gorge Regional Park =

Urban park in Minnesota, United States

- Mississippi River Gorge Regional Park
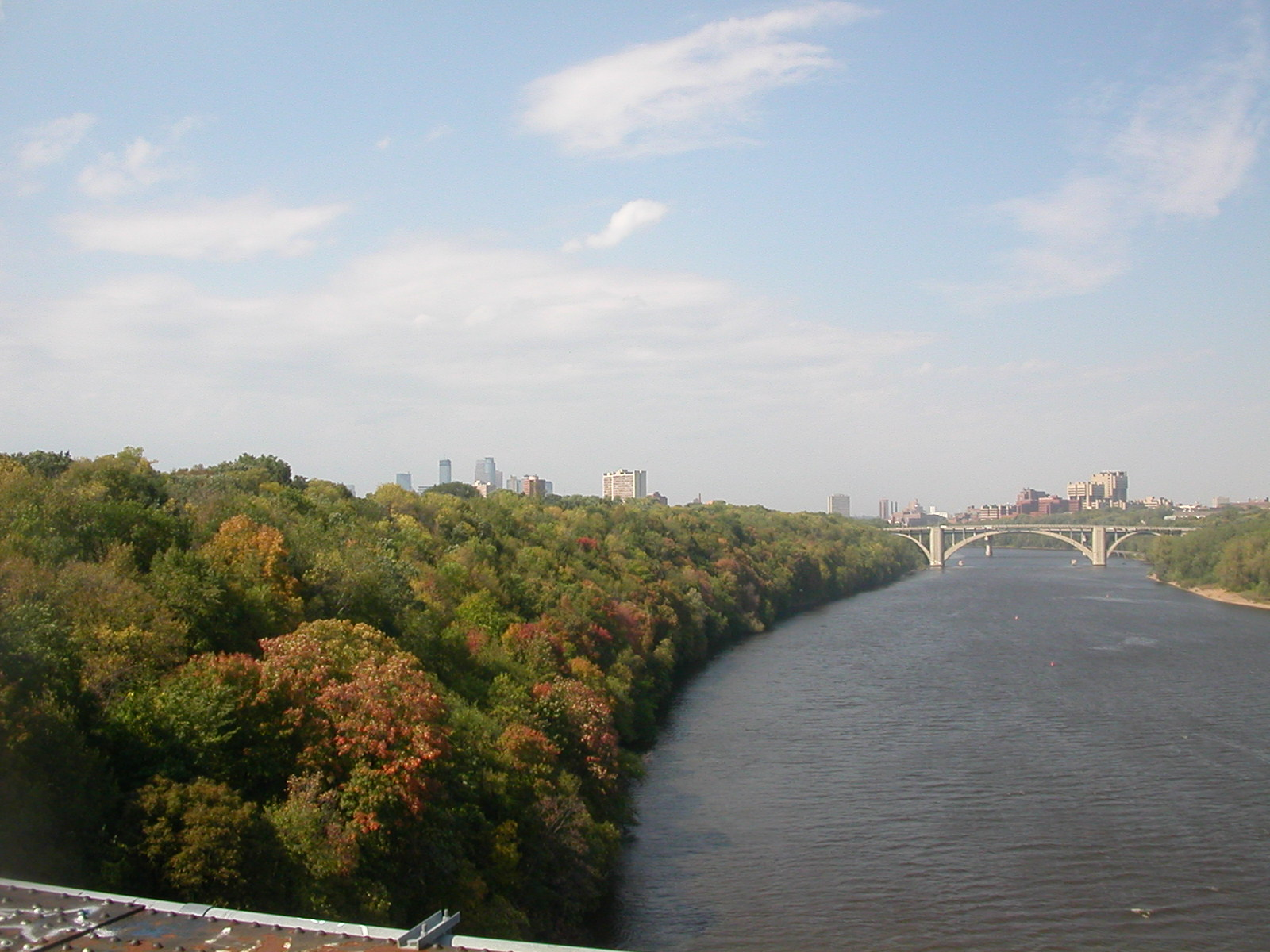
- Bluffs of the Mississippi River from the Short Line Bridge looking north
- Interactive map of Mississippi Gorge; Regional Park
- Type: Regional park
- Location: U.S. state of Minnesota
- Coordinates: 44°56′10″N 93°12′2″W
- Area: 132 acres (53 ha) in Minneapolis
- Elevation: 747 feet (228 m)
- Owner: City of Minneapolis; City of Saint Paul
- Manager: Minneapolis Park and Recreation Board; Saint Paul Parks and Recreation Department
- Visitors: Gorge park total visits: 1,189,000 in Minneapolis; 1,545,300 in Saint Paul; (in 2017)
- Status: Open
- Paths: East River Parkway; West River Parkway; River water trail; Winchell Trail
- Terrain: River gorge of the Mississippi
- Designation: Mississippi National River and Recreation Area
- Public transit: MetroTransit buses
- Website: Mississippi Gorge Regional Park; Mississippi River Gorge Regional Park

Mississippi Gorge Regional Park is a regional park along the east and west bluffs of the Mississippi River in the cities of Minneapolis and Saint Paul in the U.S. state of Minnesota. The two-city park area is between Mississippi river miles 848 and 852, from just south of Northern Pacific Bridge Number 9 to just north of Minnehaha Regional Park, and lies within the Mississippi National River and Recreation Area. The park area protects scenic and natural areas of the Mississippi River gorge, the only true gorge along the entire length of the 2,320-mile (3,730 km) river.

In Minneapolis, Mississippi Gorge Regional Park is managed by the Minneapolis Park and Recreation Board. In Saint Paul, the park area's official name is Mississippi River Gorge Regional Park, and it is managed by the Park and Recreation Department. The 132-acre (53 ha) park (acreage for Minneapolis parkland only) provides access to the river and is popular for its hiking and biking paths on the bluffs. Among local residents, the gorge is known and appreciated for its semi-wild character in the middle of an urban metropolitan area. The two-city park areas had a combined 2.7 million visits in 2017.

== History ==
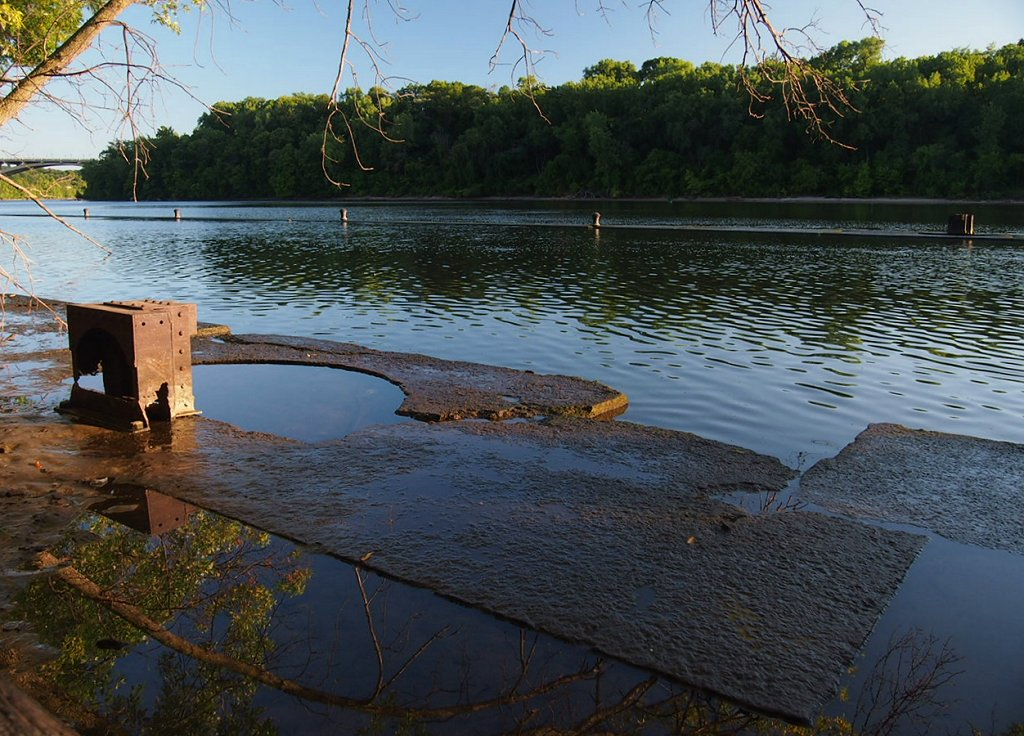
Remnants of the historic Meeker Island lock and dam in Saint Paul, 2013

The Mississippi River gorge formed over thousands of years as the River Warren Falls, known today as Saint Anthony Falls, retreated. Softer sandstone gave way and slowly collapsed the harder limestone and shale layers into the valley. The river valley in Minneapolis and Saint Paul is the only gorge along the entire 2,320-mile (3,730 km) length of the Mississippi River, with bluffs rising as high as 150 feet (46 m). The river through the gorge was a series of rapids until the early 1900s, when it was reconfigured for commercial navigation with installment of locks and dams.

In 1972, Minnesota Governor Wendell Anderson designated a 72-mile (116 km) corridor of the Mississippi through the Twin Cities as a critical natural resource area. In 1998, the United States Congress created the Mississippi National River and Recreation Area for the same corridor, bringing federal support and designation to the gorge area.

The land area between the two bluffs is managed as public park land by the cities of Minneapolis and Saint Paul. The Minneapolis Park and Recreation Board, an independent park district, manages the park area in Minneapolis, which is officially named Mississippi Gorge Regional Park and includes the 132 acres of land area flanking both the east and west banks of the Mississippi River, from just south of Bridge Number 9 to the north edge of Minnehaha Regional Park. In Saint Paul, the park area is officially named Mississippi River Gorge Regional Park and is managed by the city's Park and Recreation Department. In recent years, communities and park agencies have formed partnerships to improve the gorge's ecologic health. In the late 1990s, the National Park Service, Minneapolis park board, and Longfellow community council restored an oak savanna near East 36th Street, which allowed park visitors to see what the area looked like before European settlement.

== Park areas ==
The regional parks in Minneapolis and Saint Paul contain several distinct historic sites and parks along the gorge.

=== Minneapolis ===
Bluff Street Park - There is an upper and lower portion of the 5.3-acre (2.1 ha) park in the Cedar-Riverside neighborhood and a trail that connects downtown Minneapolis with Bridge Number 9 and the University of Minnesota.

Bohemian Flats - The location of the historic Little Bohemia shanty town has picnic areas and river cruise boats.

East River Flats Park - Just below the University of Minnesota on the east bank of the Mississippi below the bluffs, it is the training site of the women's rowing team and contains grassy areas, picnic tables, and trails.

East River Parkway - The 2-mile (3.2 km) pedestrian and bike trail that runs along the east bluff of the Mississippi from Washington Avenue to Emerald Street.

Franklin Terrace Dog Park - The 1.37-acre (0.55 ha), fenced area off Franklin Terrace in the Seward neighborhood for off-leash dogs is adjacent to Riverside Park.

Riverside Park - The 27.68-acre (11.20 ha) park on the bluff features structures constructed by the Works Progress Administration, a playground, and a wading pool.

West River Parkway - The 7.24-mile (11.65 km) pedestrian and bike trail that runs along the west bluff of the Mississippi from Plymouth Avenue to Godfrey Parkway.

=== Saint Paul ===
Meeker Island Lock and Dam - At the river bottom below the bluffs, the historic dam site features hiking trails and an off-leash dog park.

== Visitors ==
The two-park gorge area is among Minnesota's ten most visited sites. In 2017, Mississippi Gorge Regional Park in Minneapolis had 1,189,000 visits and Saint Paul's Mississippi Gorge Regional Park had 1,545,300 visits.

== Recreation ==
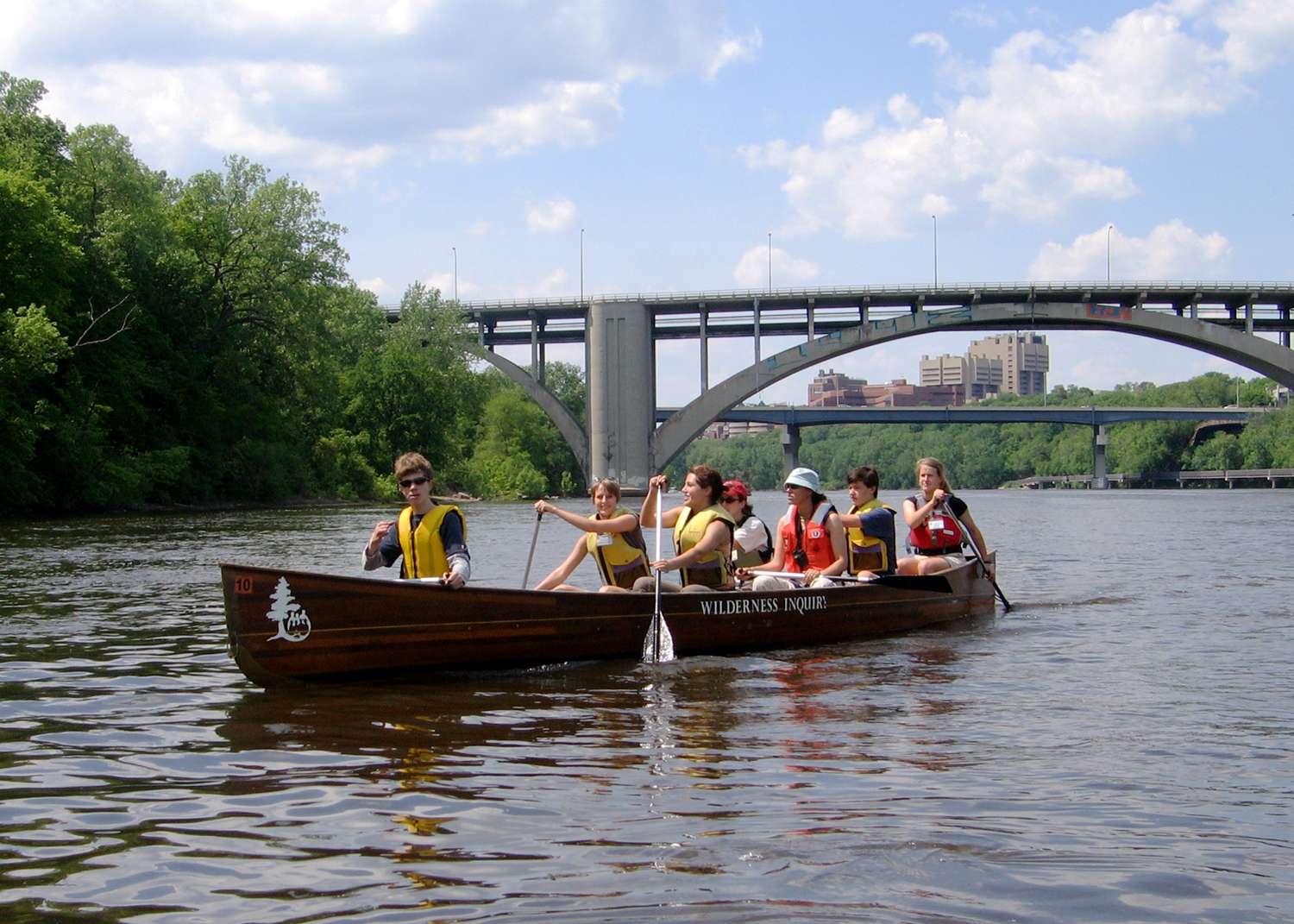
Canoeists on the Mississippi River in Minneapolis with the Franklin Avenue Bridge behind them, 2008

Mississippi Gorge Regional Park is popular for hiking, birdwatching, and photography. The abundance of sugar maples along the bluffs lend to a variety of colors with the changing fall leaves. The gorge provides habitat for at least 150 species of migratory birds and a growing population of bald eagles.

Along both sides of the gorge, the East River and West River parkways of the Grand Rounds National Scenic Byway feature miles of paved, shared-used paths for walking and cycling that connect to a regional trail system. Adjoining natural surface paths from the parkways provide pedestrian access to the river for sightseeing and fishing. In winter, snowshoeing and cross-country skiing are allowed on park trails. Mountain biking is prohibited on all natural surface trails in the gorge due to threats of erosion and potential damage to native plants.

On the river's west bank in Minneapolis, hikers and trail runners can traverse the regional park via Winchell Trail, 2.5-mile (4.0 km) rustic path from Franklin Avenue to East 44th Street. The mostly natural-surface hiking trail provides access to the floodplain forest, sandy beaches, and an oak savanna restoration project. Several limestone staircases constructed by the Works Progress Administration descend from the West River Parkway to the gorge floor.

The river and gorge can also be explored via watercraft. The gorge is a segment of Mississippi River State Water Trail that passes through it. Chartered river cruise boats depart seasonally from Bohemian Flats. The Minneapolis Rowing Club boathouse is below the Lake Street-Marshall Bridge for serious athletes and amateurs to paddle on the river. Canoes and kayaks can be launched as several locations in the gorge with routes from Hidden Falls and the rowing club boathouse most recommended. The locks and dams on opposite ends of the gorge have closed permanently to commercial and recreation traffic to block invasive carp species.

== See also ==
- Geography of Minneapolis
- History of Minneapolis
- History of Saint Paul, Minnesota
- Lake Street (Minneapolis)
- Trails in Minneapolis
- Upper Mississippi River
