= Geography of Minneapolis =

Minneapolis is the largest city in the state of Minnesota in the United States, and the county seat of Hennepin County.

== Physical ==
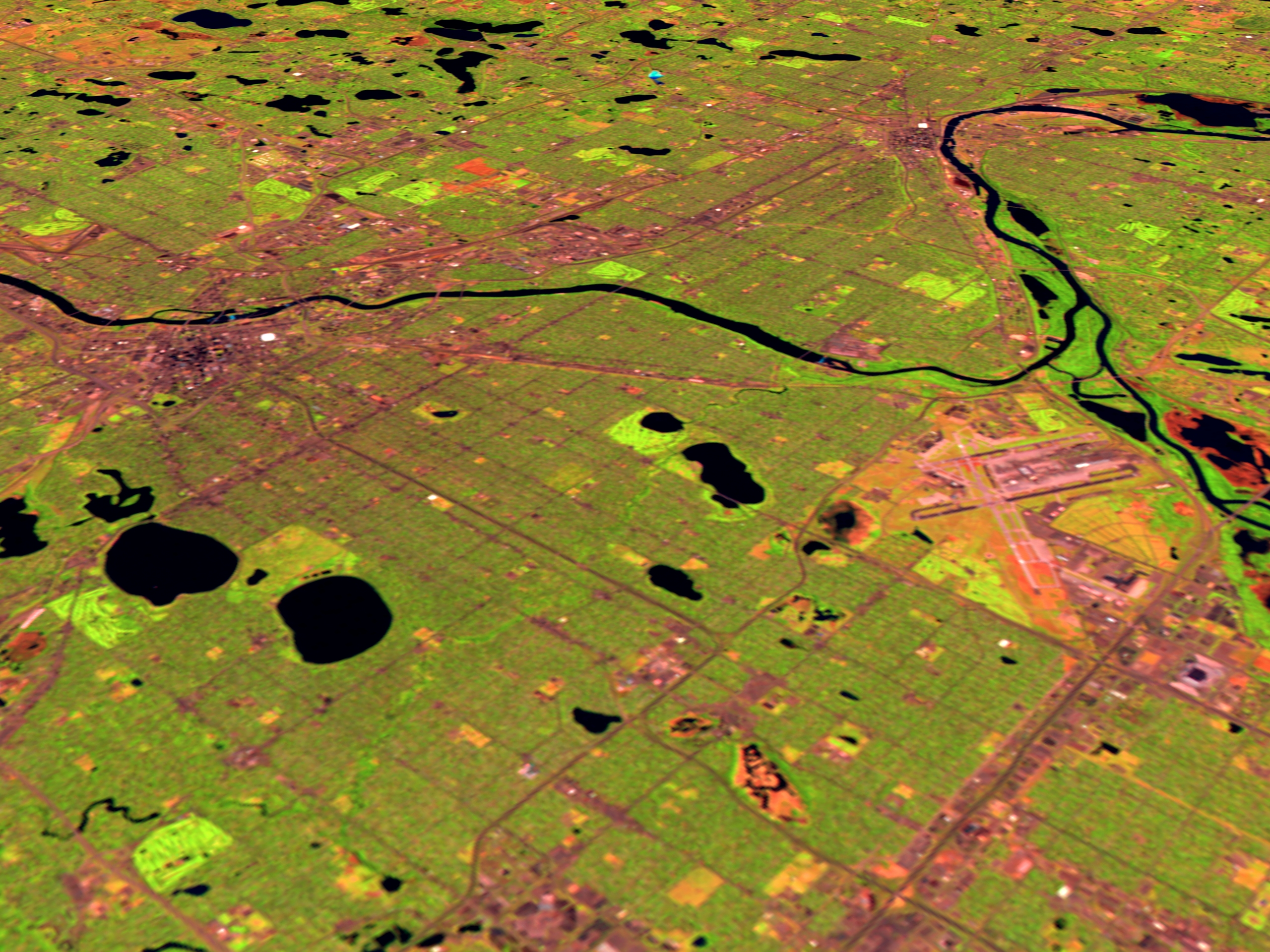
Minneapolis flyby courtesy NASA/Goddard Scientific Visualization Studio

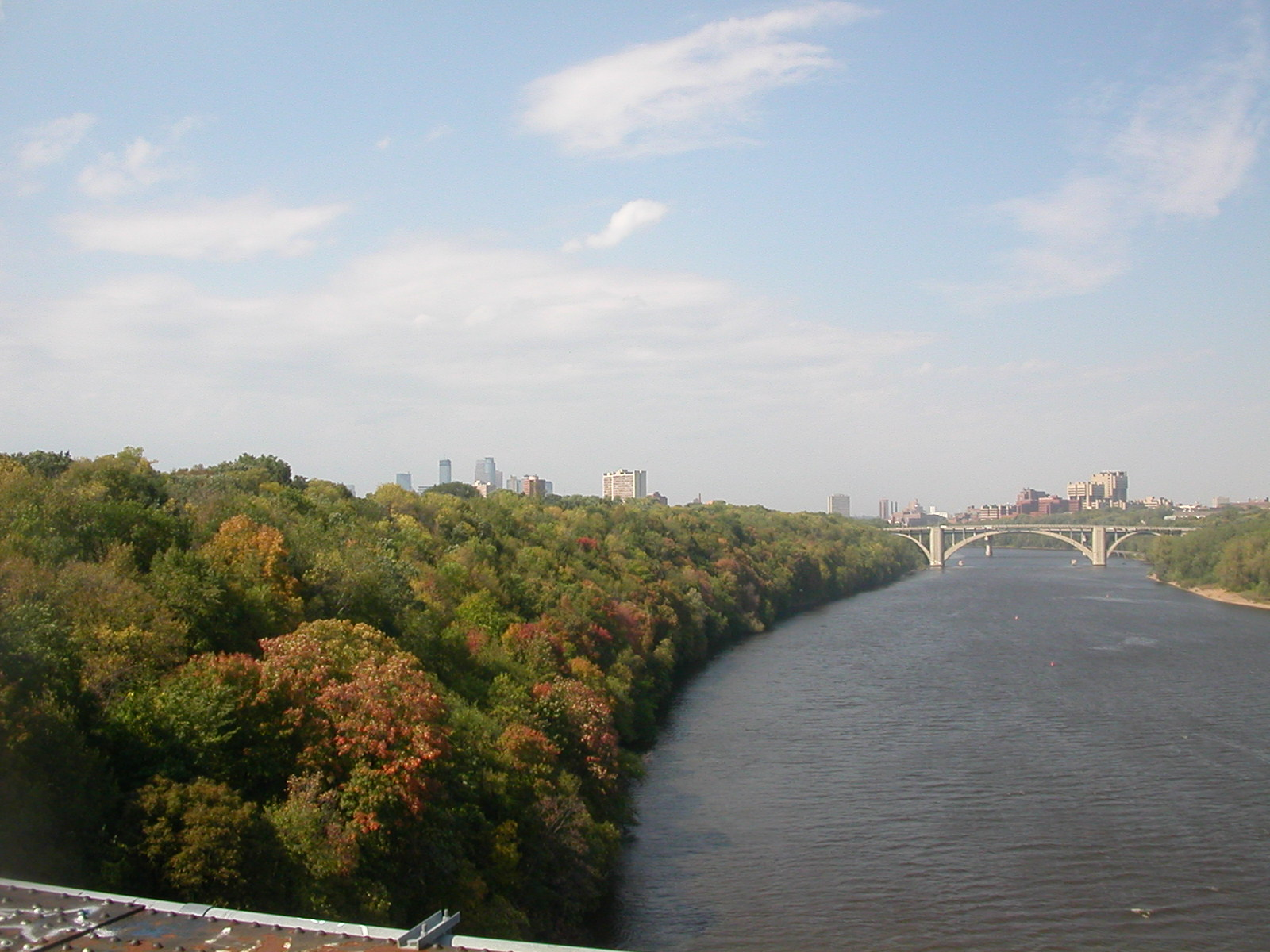
Minneapolis on the Mississippi River

According to the United States Census Bureau, the city has a total area of 58.4 square miles (151 square kilometers). 54.9 sq mi (142 km^{2}) of it is land and 3.5 sq mi (9.1 km^{2}) of it (6.01%) is water. The city center is located just south of 45 degrees north latitude. On the south side of Golden Valley Road just east of Wirth Parkway, a stone containing a weathered plaque marks a point on the 45th parallel. The Mississippi, which runs to the southeast, directed the early growth of the city. Most early streets ran parallel to the river to maximize the amount of land that could be used. Eventually, growth of Minneapolis turned to north-south and east-west streets. Many unique intersections like Seven Corners on the eastern periphery of downtown were formed to translate between the two layouts. Some streets, especially older and more traditionally important ones like Hennepin Avenue and Nicollet Avenue, have both orientations at different points.

== Parks and lakes ==
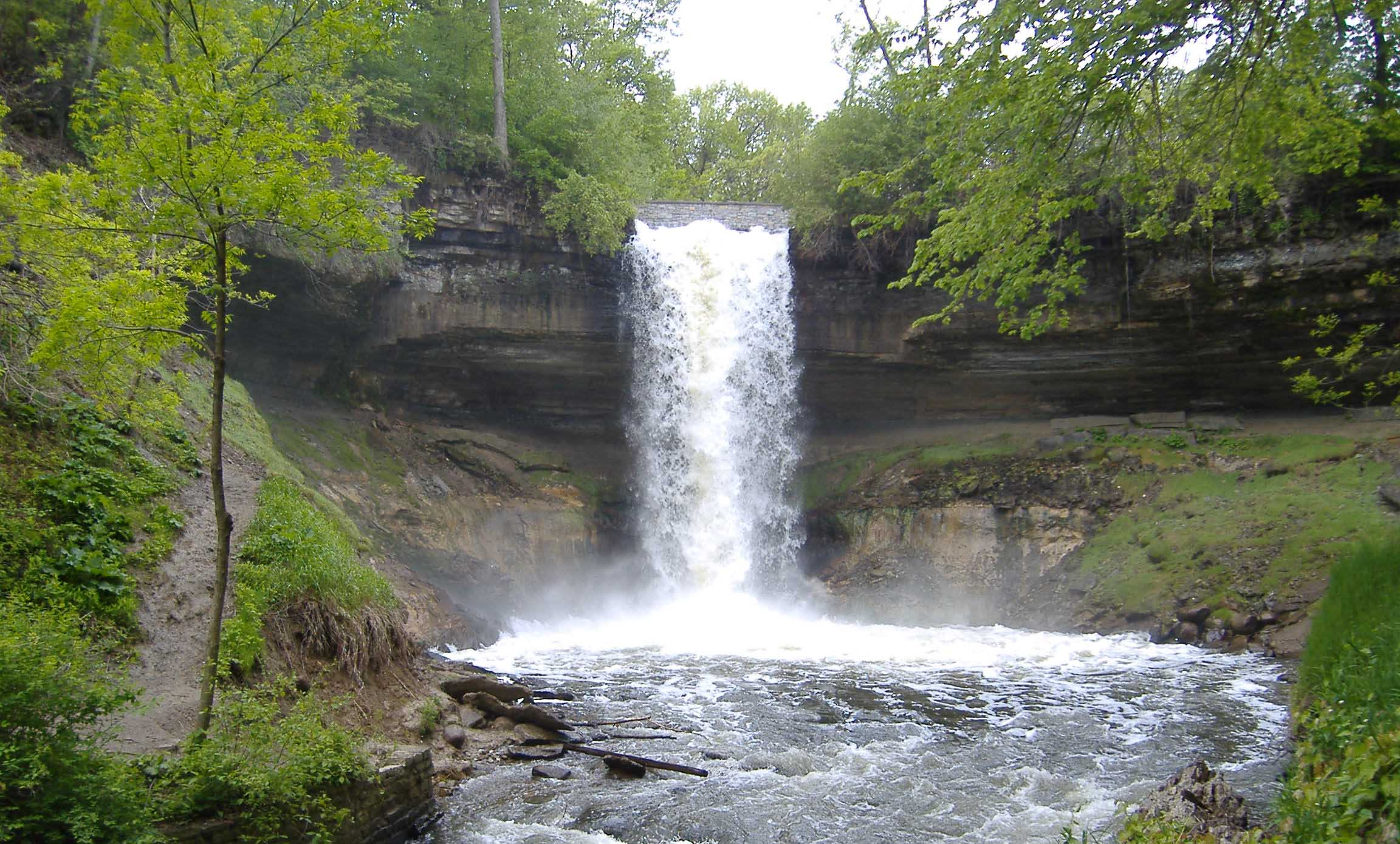
Minnehaha Falls

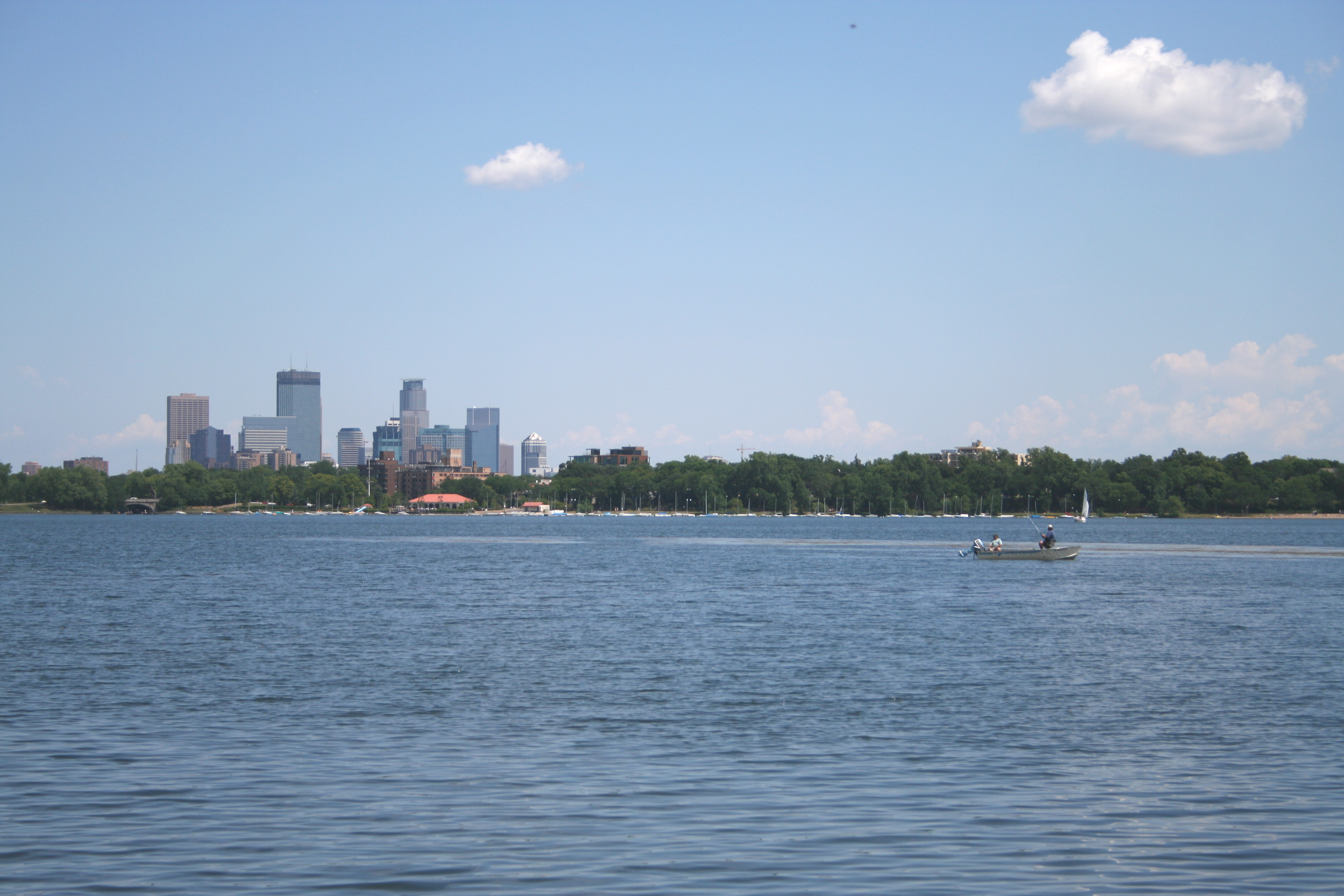
Bde Maka Ska

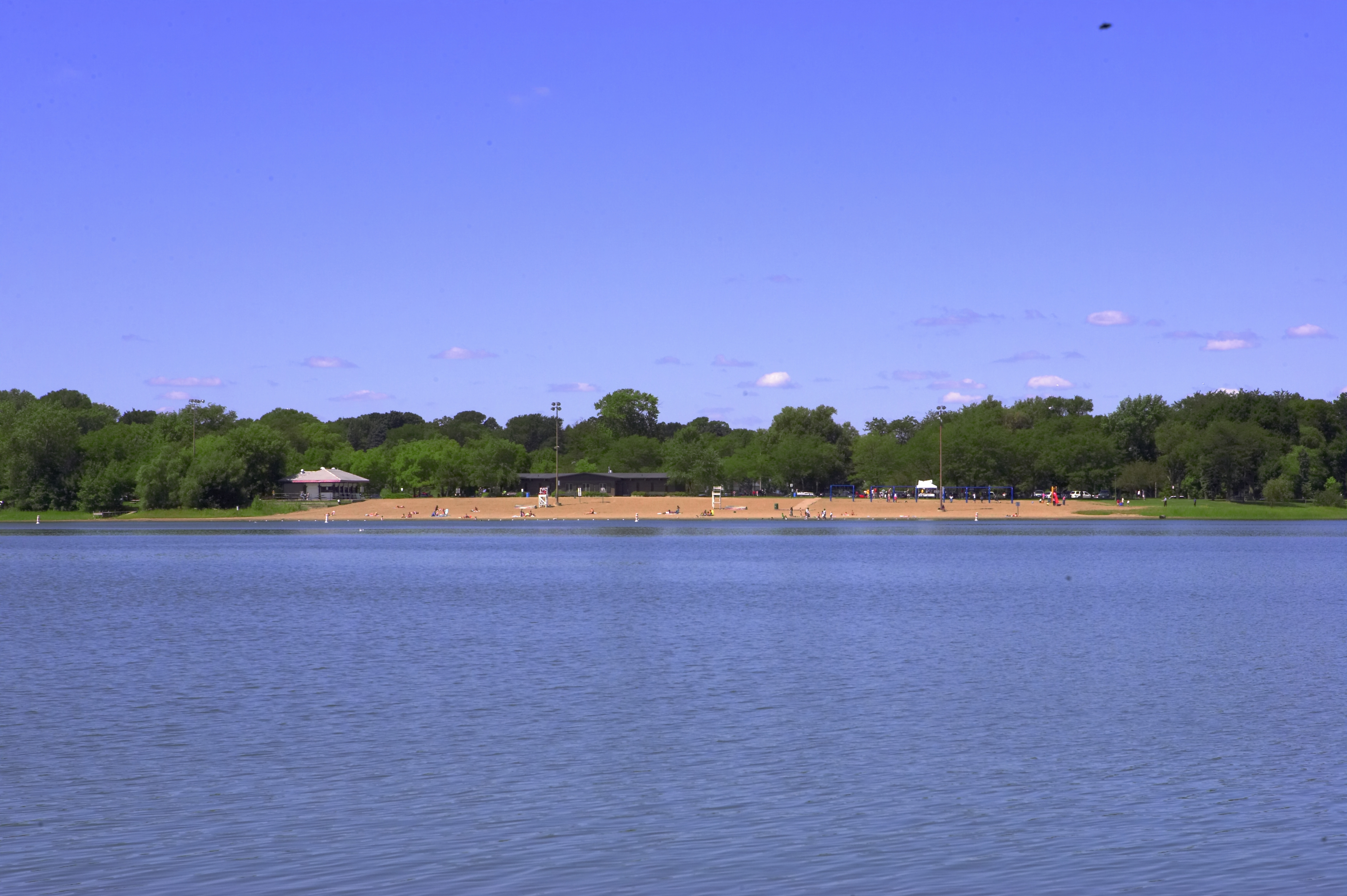
Lake Nokomis

Minneapolis has a large park system consisting of ten square miles (26 km²) of land and water that is interlinked in many places. Theodore Wirth is often credited with the development of this system that brought a playground within the reach of most children and the canopy of trees and boulevards in much of the city. The Mississippi National River and Recreation Area connects regional parks and visitors centers.

Theodore Wirth Park is the largest in the city, shared with Golden Valley, and is about 60% the size of Central Park in New York City. Minnehaha Park is one of the most famous, the site of Minnehaha Falls and cultural heritage events every year. Tower Hill Park in Prospect Park is the home of a 1913 water tower, one of the highest points in Minneapolis.

The Grand Rounds Scenic Byway circles through the city and many of the larger park areas including land along the Mississippi, lakes and scenic areas. A parkway for cars, a bikeway for riders, and a walkway for pedestrians run parallel paths along the 50-mile route. A growing number of bikeways and walkways crisscross the city and interconnect with neighboring cities.

Twenty four small lakes are within the city limits. Among the largest freshwater lakes to the west are Lake Harriet, Bde Maka Ska, Lake of the Isles, and Cedar Lake, known together as the "Chain of Lakes". Lake Nokomis and Lake Hiawatha are to the east. Connected by bike, running and walking paths, Minneapolis lakes are used for swimming, fishing, picnics and boating.

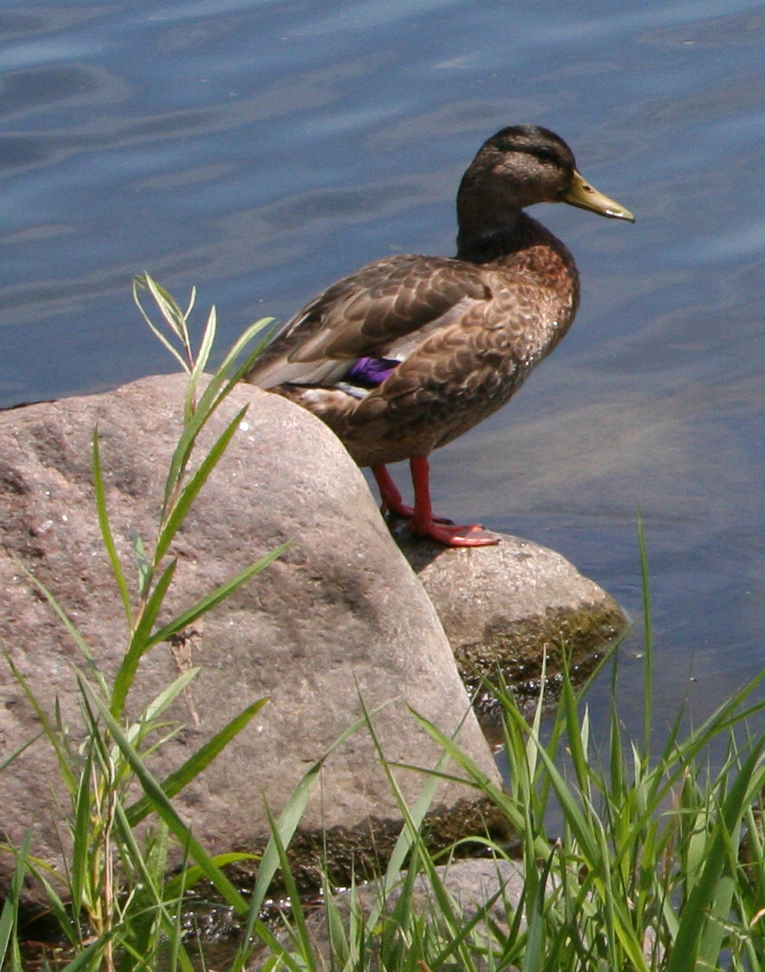
Mallard at Bde Maka Ska

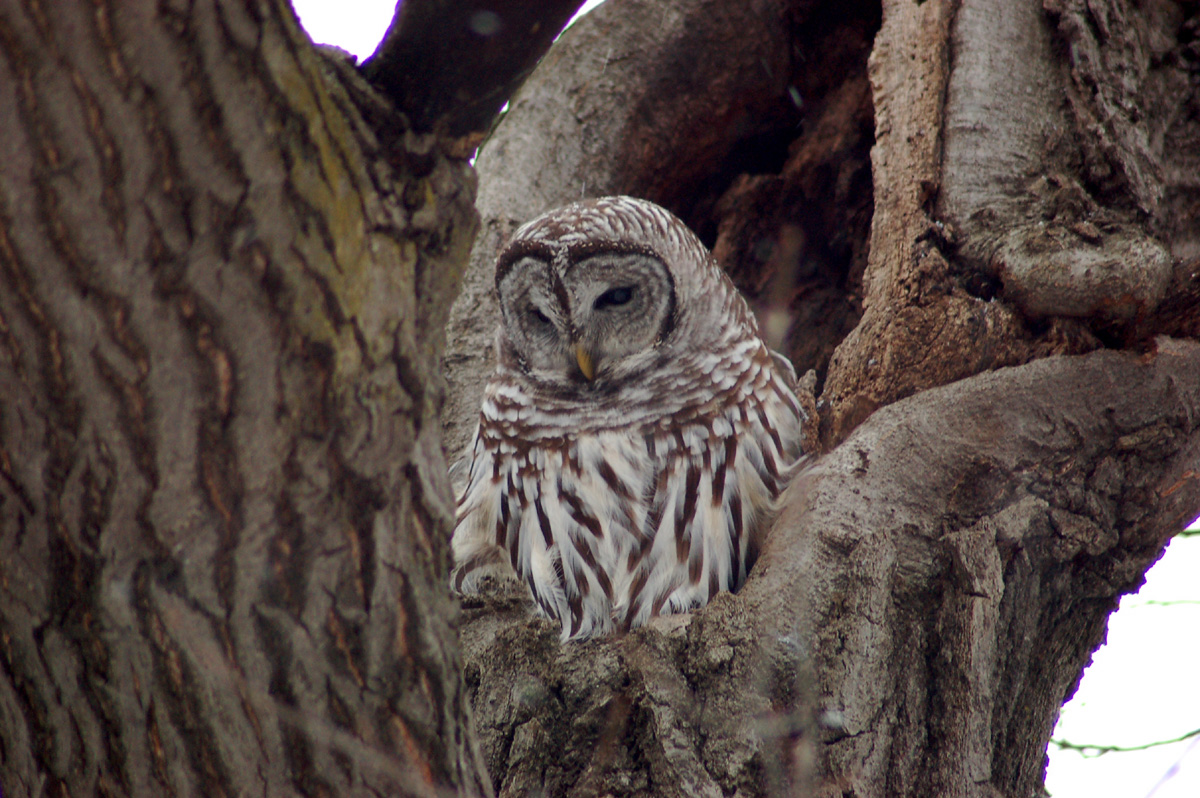
Barred owl at Minnehaha Park

== Waterfalls ==
The area now occupied by the Twin Cities generally consisted of a 155-foot (47 m) thick layer of St. Peter Sandstone, under a sixteen-foot (4.9 m) thick layer of shale, under a 35-foot (11 m) thick layer of Platteville limestone. These layers were the result of an Ordovician Period sea which covered east-central Minnesota 500 million years ago. The hard limestone cap was formed from fossilized shell fish. About 20,000 years ago, the area was covered by the Superior Lobe of the Laurentide Ice Sheet, which left the St. Croix moraine on the Twin Cities as it receded. Later the Grantsburg Sublobe of the Des Moines Lobe also covered the area. Under these vast layers of ice, tunnel valleys were formed, cutting through the limestone layer with tremendous force, to release ice meltwater and glacier effluence. The result was a series of troughs in the limestone, which were filled by glacial till and outwash deposit as the glaciers receded. Sometimes the sediment would be mixed with huge chunks of ice, which would leave voids in the soil. These voids created basins for the Twin Cities Lakes, such as Harriet and Lake Calhoun. Connecting the city lakes in several north-south arteries are gorges cut through the bedrock, but filled with sand and sediment.

When River Warren Falls receded past the confluence of the much smaller Upper Mississippi River, a new waterfall was created where that river entered the much-lower glacial River Warren. The new falls also receded upstream on the Mississippi, carving the Mississippi River gorge, as it migrated eight miles (12875 m) over 9,600 years to where Louis Hennepin first saw it and named St. Anthony Falls in 1680. Due to its value as a power source, this waterfall determined the location of Minneapolis. One branch of the river coming from the west, Minnehaha Creek receded only a few hundred yards from one of the channels of the Mississippi. Minnehaha Falls remains as a picturesque and informative relic of River Warren Falls, and the limestone-over-sandstone construction is readily apparent in its small gorge. Other waterfalls in Minneapolis include the Hidden Falls and the Bridal Veil Falls.
