= Northern Pacific Bridge Number 9 =

Northern Pacific Bridge #9
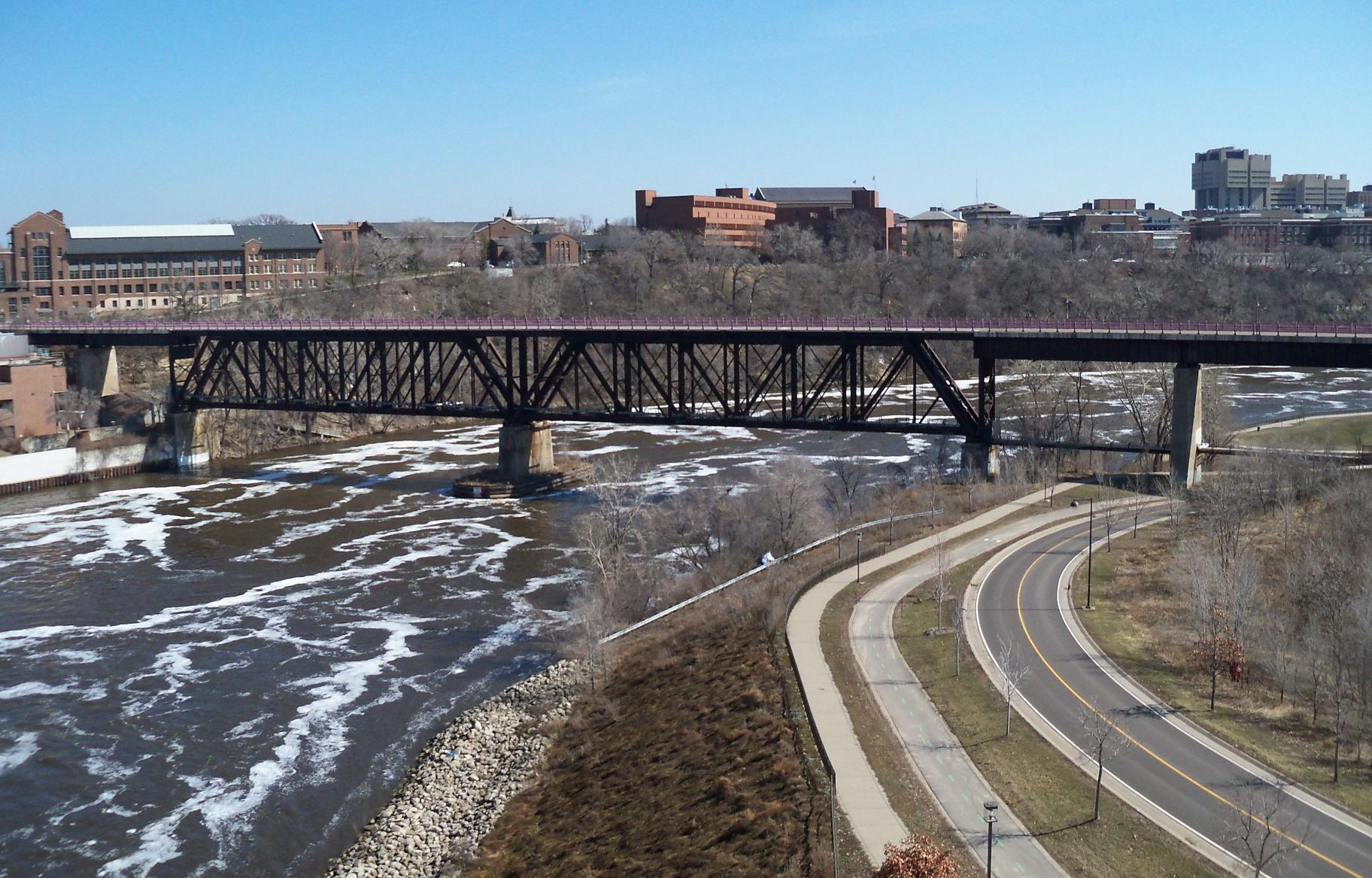
- Bridge #9 as seen from the 10th Avenue Bridge over the Mississippi River.
- Coordinates: 44°58′39″N 93°14′28″W
- Carries: Bike and pedestrian lanes; formerly two railroad tracks
- Crosses: Mississippi River
- Locale: Minneapolis, Minnesota
- Maintained by: City of Minneapolis
- ID number: 94246

Characteristics
- Design: Truss bridge
- Total length: 952 feet
- Width: 24 feet
- Longest span: 245 feet
- Clearance below: 39 feet

History
- Opened: 1924

Location
- Interactive map of Northern Pacific Bridge #9

Northern Pacific Bridge #9 is a deck truss bridge that spans the Mississippi River in Minneapolis, Minnesota, between the Seven Corners area and the University of Minnesota campus. It was built in 1924 and was designed by Frederick W. Cappelen. Railroad use of the bridge ended in 1981, and in 1999 the bridge was opened to bicycles and pedestrians. It replaced the former Northern Pacific "A Line" bridge. The span was closed for eight months beginning April 7, 2025 for construction to extend its life for 50 years. The work was completed January 16, 2026.

== History ==
The Northern Pacific Railway "A line" tracks once formed the southern boundary of the University of Minnesota East Bank campus. but as the University grew, the campus expanded southward around the railroad. The railroad noise, congestion, and pollution caused problems around the campus. In response, the Northern Pacific Railway built a new bridge that angled north of the campus, connecting with an existing Great Northern railroad line going through Dinkytown. This enabled campus expansion and allowed the Northrop Mall to be built.

Today, the bridge is open to bicyclists and pedestrians. The bridge is accessible from the west side, where there is a connection to the West River Parkway trail, and on the east side via a service road up to East River Parkway near the Mineral Resources Research Center. Historic markers on either side of the bridge describe how the bridge was built and its importance to the area.

The City of Minneapolis built a connection from the bridge to the U of M bicycle and pedestrian trail through Dinkytown in 2013. As part of the construction of the new St. Anthony Falls (35W) Bridge approach, a culvert was installed to allow the non-motorized trail to continue west into downtown Minneapolis; this was completed in July 2014.

On the south side of the deck, the words "North Coast Lim" can be seen. It formerly read North Coast Limited to advertise the Chicago to Seattle passenger train of that name.

== See also ==
- List of crossings of the Upper Mississippi River
