= Washington Avenue Bridge (Minneapolis) =

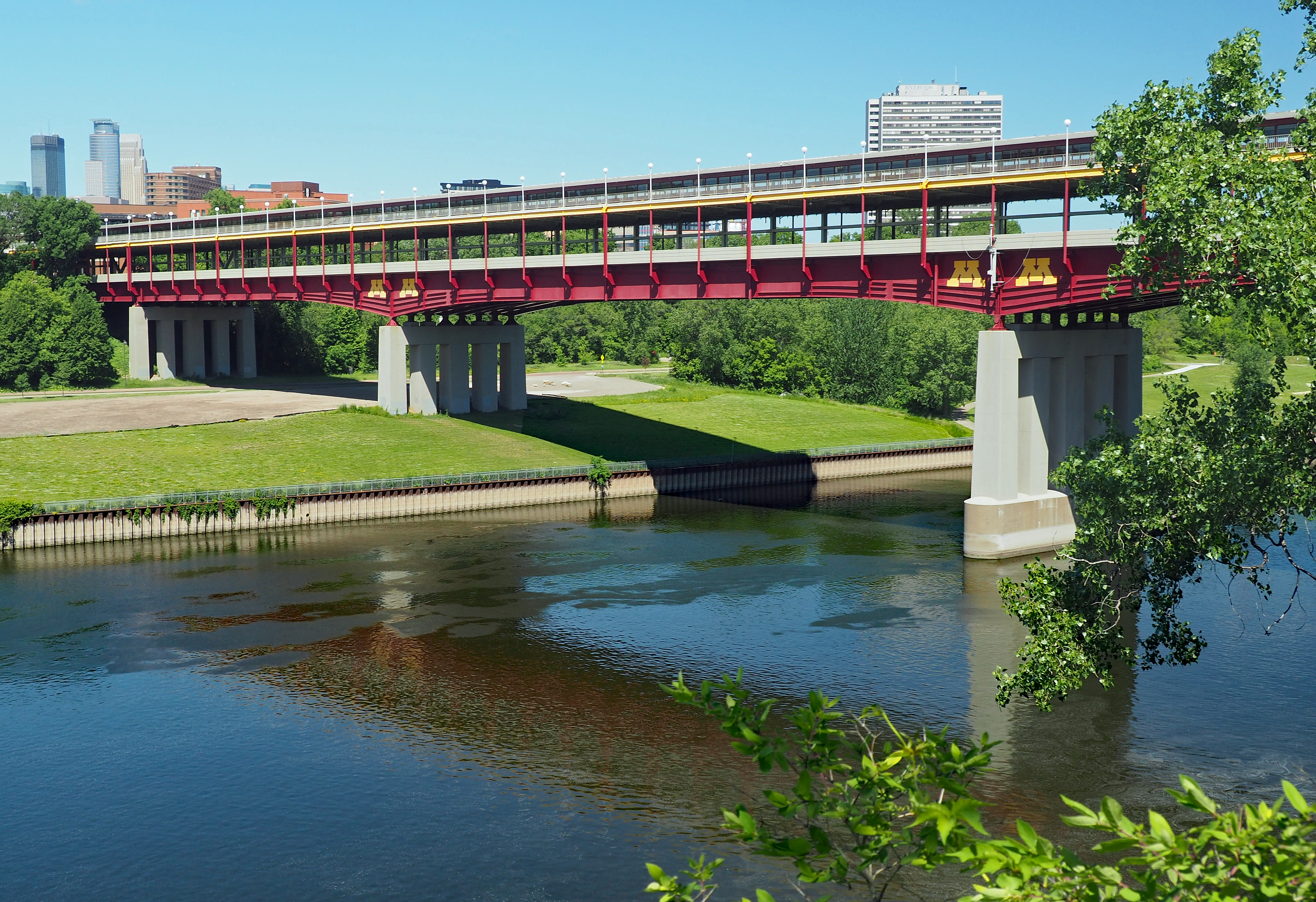
- The Washington Avenue Bridge from the southeast
- Coordinates: 44°58′24″N 93°14′21″W
- Carries: Upper deck: Bicycles and pedestrians Lower deck: County Road 122, one auto lane each direction and the METRO Green Line light rail
- Crosses: Mississippi River
- Locale: Minneapolis, Minnesota
- Maintained by: Hennepin County, Minnesota (1997–present); Minnesota Department of Transportation (1965–1997)
- ID number: 9360

Characteristics
- Design: Plate girder bridge
- Total length: 1130 feet
- Longest span: 251 feet
- Clearance below: 70 feet

History
- Opened: 1965

Location
- Interactive map of Washington Avenue Bridge

The Washington Avenue Bridge carries County Road 122 and the METRO Green Line light rail across the Mississippi River in Minneapolis, connecting the East Bank and West Bank campuses of the University of Minnesota. The bridge has two decks, with the lower deck designated for motor vehicle traffic and light rail trains and the upper deck used for pedestrians and bicycles (lanes specifically for bikes are on the north side). It is a utilitarian structure with simple architecture, but it has cultural significance because thousands of students, faculty, staff, and visitors walk across it every day.

Most users of the bridge get across it using some mode other than a personal automobile. Minnesota Department of Transportation traffic counts from 2007 show the bridge carried about 28,400 vehicles per day at that time. However, multiple counts from 2009 indicate the bridge carried a total of 71,400 people per day when other modes were also included. The greatest single mode was still motor vehicles at 37.6%, but 32.7% used bus transit, 19.9% walked, and 9.6% used bicycles, with a remaining 0.3% using other methods such as inline skating. The bridge is a cycling hot spot and, with 6,850 riders per day, may carry more bikes than any other route in Minneapolis.

In 2011, as part of construction for the METRO Green Line light rail, reconfiguration of the bridge began. The original two eastbound and westbound traffic lanes were permanently reduced to one lane eastbound and one lane westbound, using the outside lanes. The two inside (center) lanes are now dedicated to light rail. The light rail line opened on June 14, 2014.

== History ==
=== The first bridge (1884–1965) ===
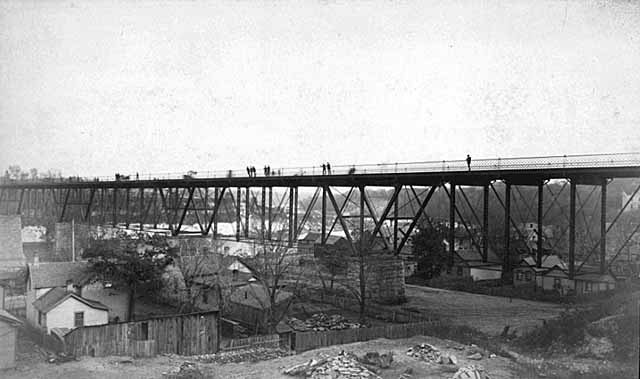
Original bridge circa 1885

An iron truss bridge was first built here in 1884, slightly upstream from the current location (connecting Washington Avenue on both sides of the river). At the time of construction, many people lived in the river flats area below, a neighborhood known as Bohemian Flats (See photo below). The bridge was strengthened in 1890 to accommodate streetcars, and it made up part of the first interurban line between Minneapolis and neighboring Saint Paul (see Twin City Rapid Transit). Streetcar service ended in 1954. Construction of the current bridge began in 1962 and the 1884 bridge was torn down in 1965.

=== The second bridge (1965–present) ===
This first structure was a straight east-west bridge carrying Washington Avenue, which continued directly into downtown. The new bridge aimed the west end slightly to the south, so Washington Avenue is now disjointed at that point. Continuing straight along the roadway will carry a vehicle into downtown along a short freeway-like section that meets 3rd Street South (a one-way—returning involves traveling along 4th Street).

The top deck on the new bridge was originally just a flat space. Traversing the bridge in the harshness of winter was very uncomfortable, so an enclosure running down the center of the pedestrian area was added by the 1970s. Originally meant to be a heated indoor pedestrian area, due to energy cost concerns, the walkway is mostly unheated. There are some heaters inside that keep the area slightly warmer than outside, and some heat loss from the steam mains, but it can still dip below the freezing point. The structure also adds a windbreak for the top level, improving conditions for people who choose to walk outside. In the summer, large overhangs also provide some shade.

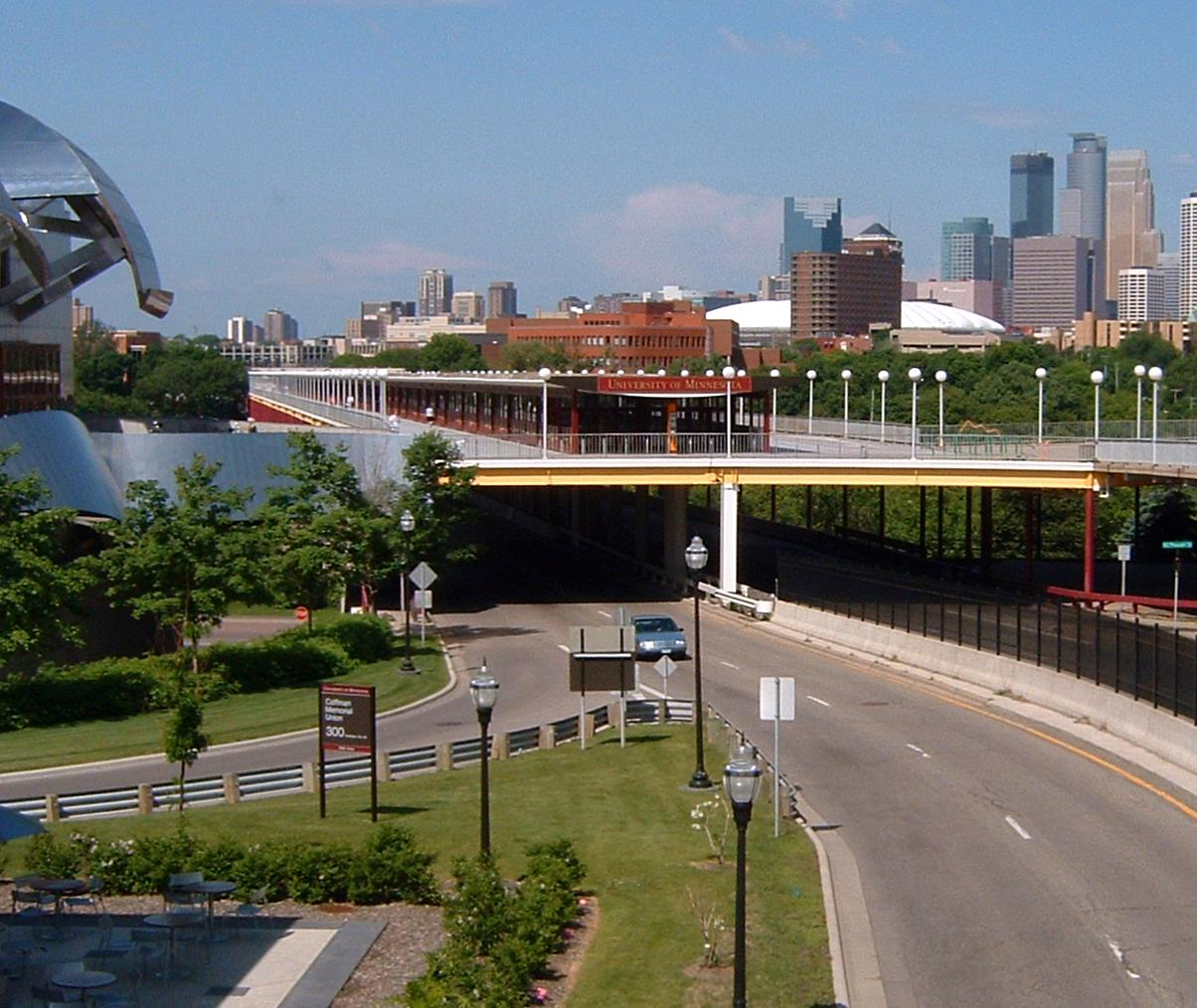
East entrance to the bridge, prior to the lower level reconfiguration for the METRO Green Line.

At least one designer had much grander plans. Winston Close, an adviser from the university to the architectural team, envisioned modeling the top level on the Ponte Vecchio bridge in Florence, Italy. This would have included shops, making the bridge a place to stay rather than just get across. Some effort has been put into making the site a more inviting place. The addition of the upper deck enclosure led to an annual artistic event held on the first few days of classes, where organizations of all stripes can put their brushes to panels lining the interior. While most are self-promotional messages from campus groups, some of the panels always show impressive designs.

The exterior of the bridge had a rather drab combination of brown and gray for most of its existence. Some felt that it was off-balance in its university surroundings, especially after the Frank Gehry-designed Weisman Art Museum went into place next to the east end in the 1990s. University President Mark Yudof led a "Take Pride in U" campaign in 1997 where the top level was painted in the school colors of maroon and gold. Later, in the first decade of the 2000s, the superstructure was also painted over the course of about two years. This had to be arranged with Hennepin County, which owns the bridge. It took a long time to repaint because the old paint contained lead and had to be carefully removed.

==== 2008 repairs and pedestrian-level restrictions ====
In August 2008, concerns about the strength of the upper level led Hennepin County to restrict the pedestrian and bicycle traffic to a 14-foot-wide section in the center. Engineers had decided that in preparation for repairs, the weight needed to be moved to the center, where there was support from the columns below. Usage of the upper deck continued to be restricted for about a year until repairs were complete.

==== 2011–2012 upgrades for light rail ====
The 1965 bridge was designed as a fracture-critical structure, meaning that it lacked redundancy in its design and could have collapsed if any single one of certain load-bearing members were to fail. Upgrades strengthened the bridge to help it carry the 106,000-pound (48,000 kg) rail vehicles and added redundancy so that the failure of a single bridge member would not cause a catastrophe. The bridge was reduced to one lane in each direction in early 2011 as part of construction of the METRO Green Line and upper deck traffic has been shifted to one half of the bridge.

On 16 May 2011, Washington Avenue just east of the bridge was permanently closed to personal motor vehicle traffic. The roadway was converted into an exclusive use transit mall between Pleasant and Walnut Streets, so all eastbound lower-level traffic other than buses and emergency vehicles must exit to East River Parkway/Delaware Street and the only westbound access to the bridge for most cars will be from Pleasant Street Southeast.

=== Roadway designations ===
Historically, the Washington Avenue Bridge carried U.S. Highway 12 and U.S. Highway 52, but those highways were officially rerouted along nearby Interstate 94 in the 1980s. The roadway appears to have been briefly designated as Minnesota State Highway 12. The road corridor between Interstate 35W in the west and University Avenue in the east was soon designated as Minnesota State Highway 122, but that ended in 1997 when Hennepin County took over control of the roadway from the Minnesota Department of Transportation.

=== Suicides ===
Installation of anti-suicide railings in 2026

A darker facet of the bridge's history is its association with suicide. Poet and university professor John Berryman is the most famous person to have killed himself at the site, when he jumped from the bridge in 1972. For over five decades, the bridge has seen an average of three to five suicides a year.

Following the suicide of former student Kayla Gaebel in 2023, her mother, MJ Blair, launched a campaign to install suicide-prevention measures. At the approval of University President Rebecca Miriam Cunningham, temporary chain link fencing was erected in 2024, separating the side railings from the pedestrian walkway. In 2025, the Minnesota Legislature passed a transportation bill which included $8 million to build suicide-prevention barriers on the bridge. In 2026, upgraded railings, lights, signage, and surveillance technology were installed.

== Gallery ==
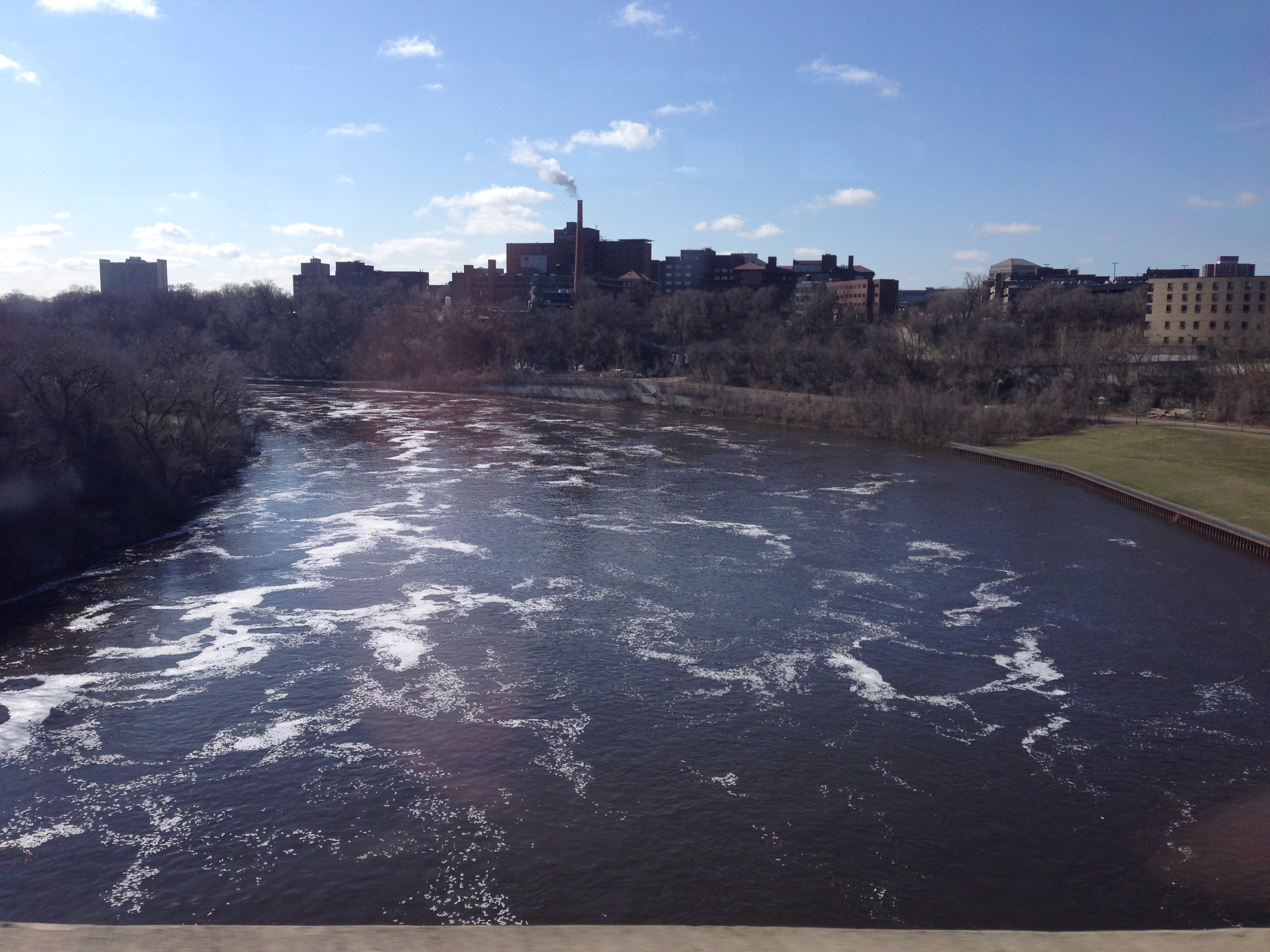
View of the Mississippi River from the bridge, looking south

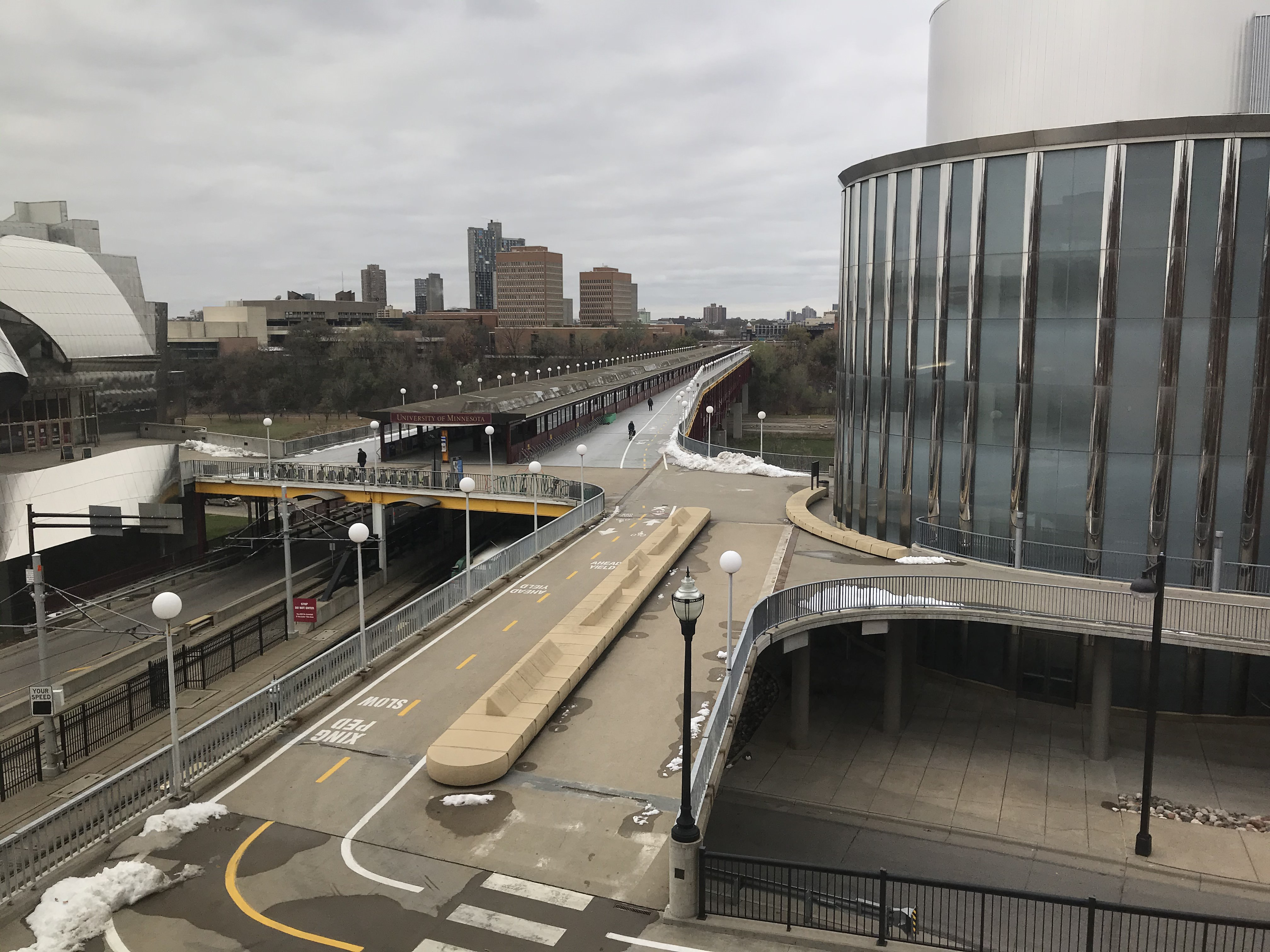
East approach to the bridge post-reconfiguration

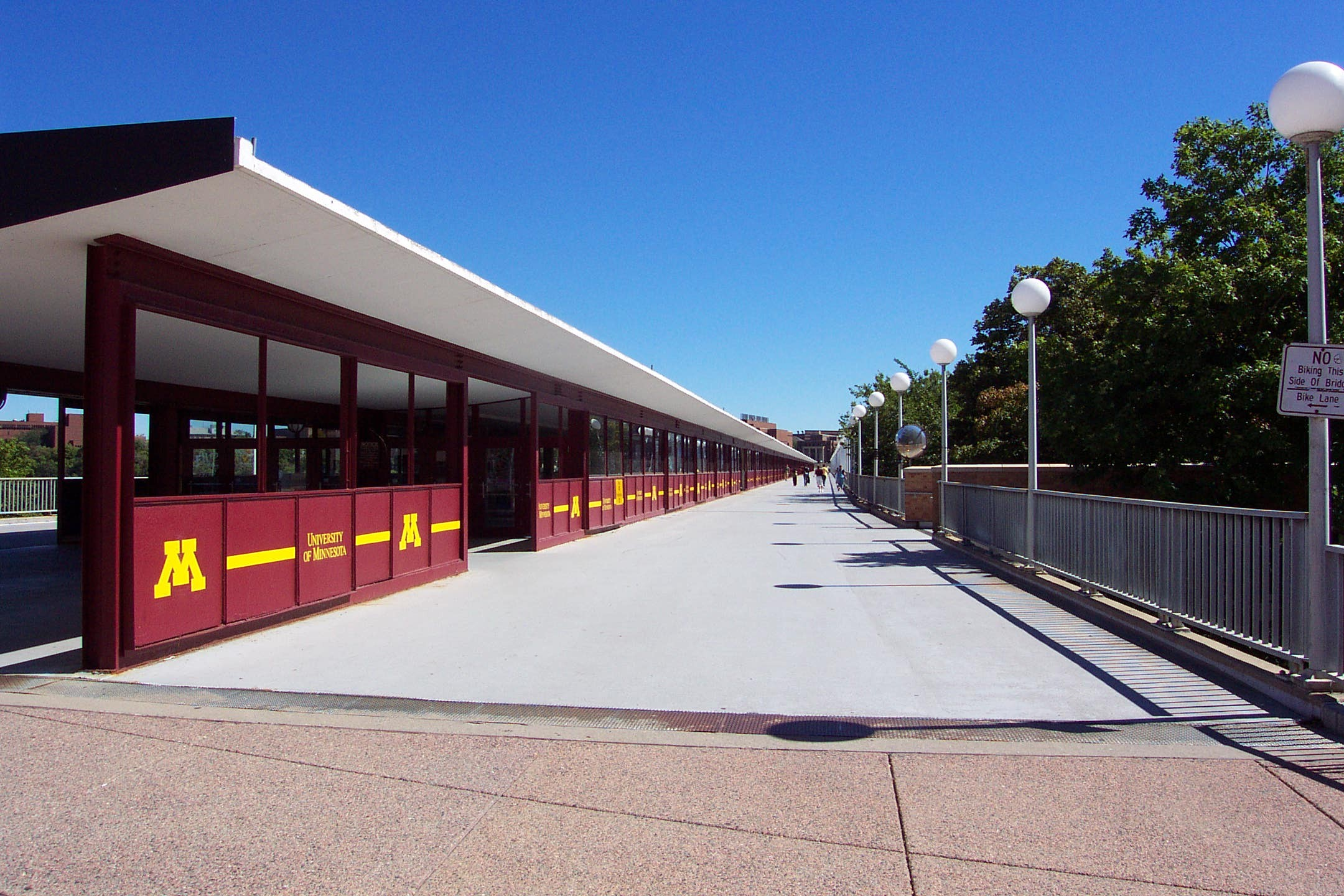
West pedestrian-level entrance to the bridge

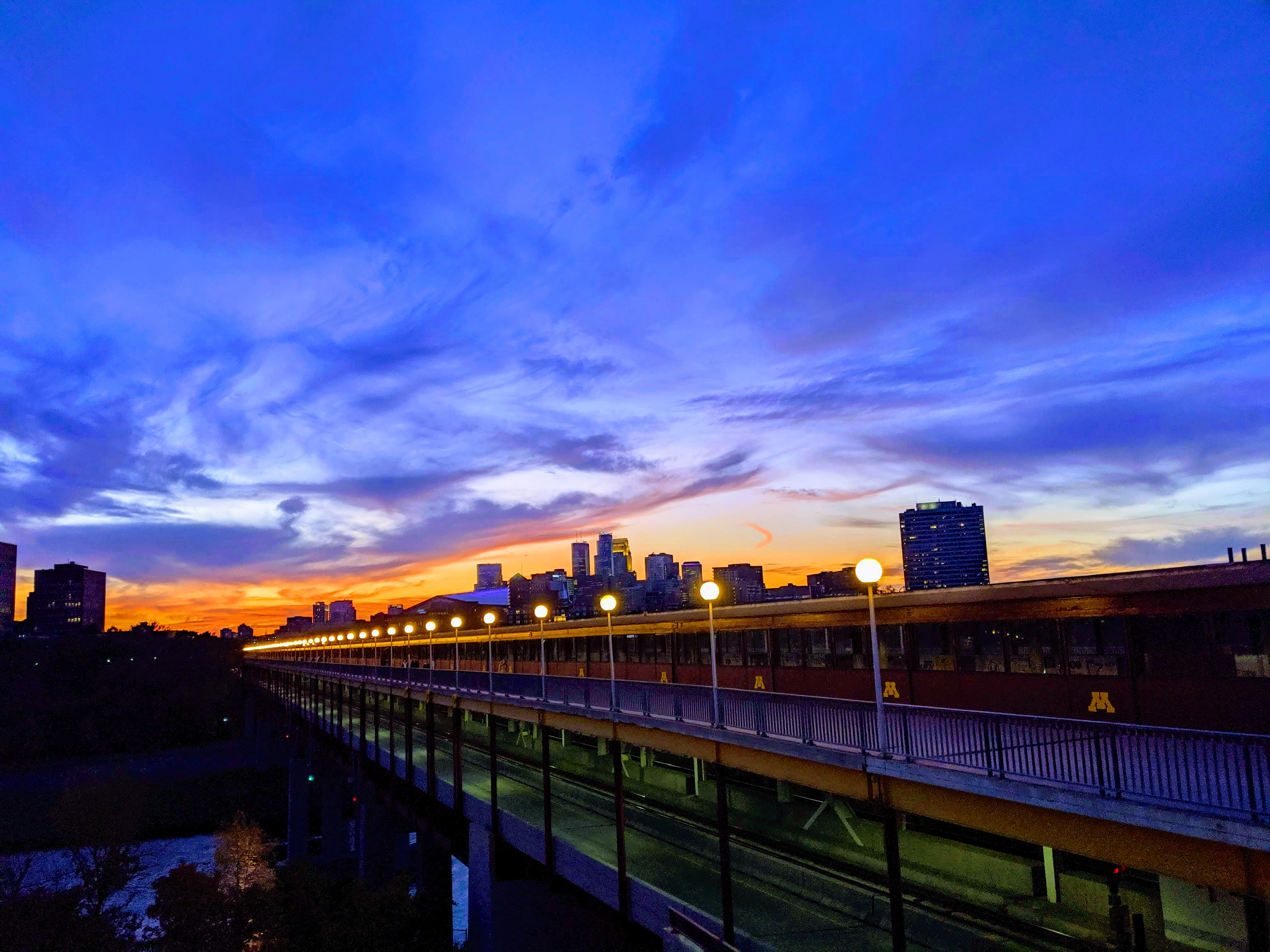
The bridge seen at night from the Mississippi River's east bank.

== See also ==
- List of crossings of the Upper Mississippi River
- List of shared-use paths in Minneapolis
