= Bohemian Flats =

City park in Minneapolis

Bohemian Flats Park
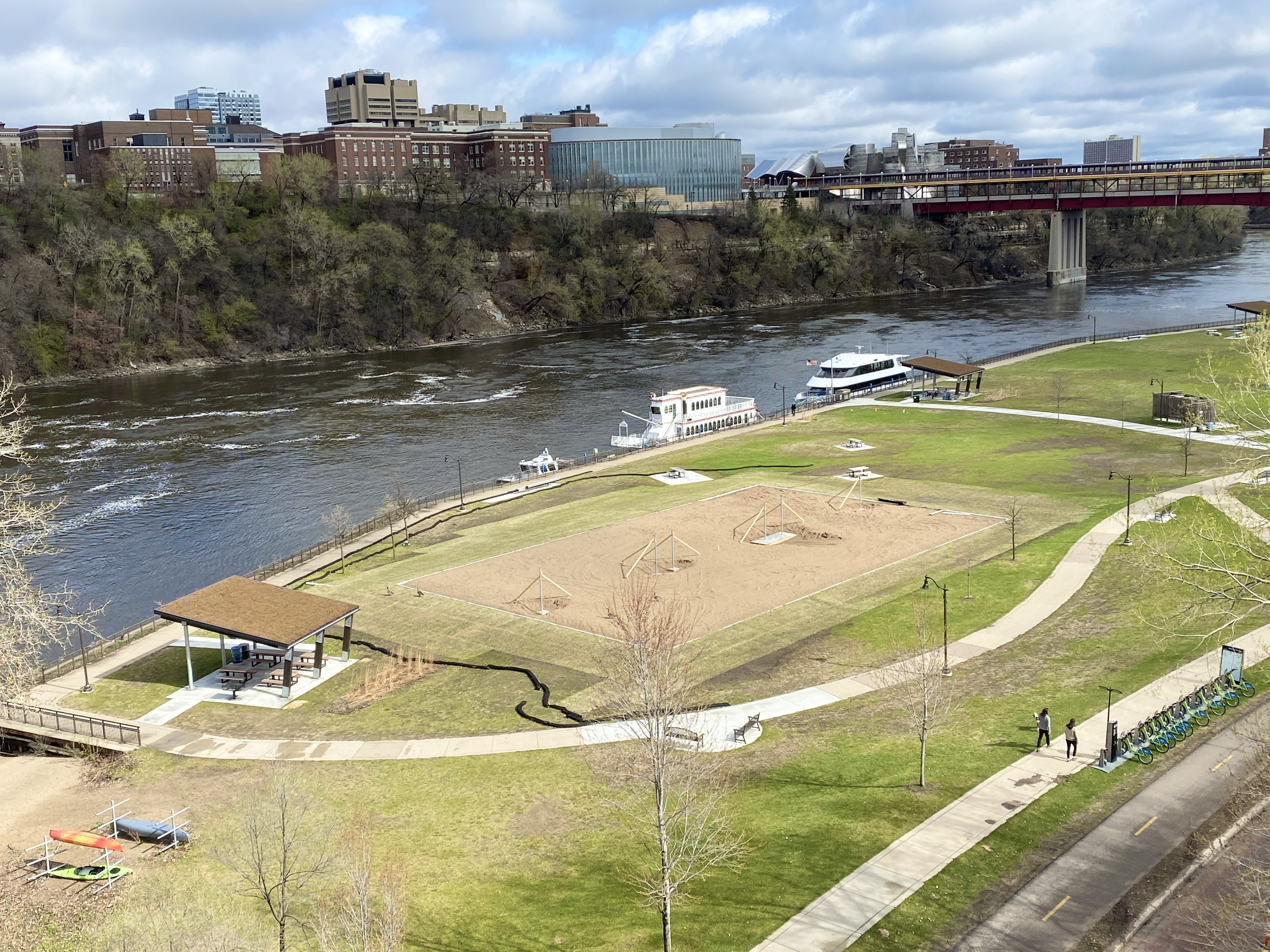
- Bohemian Flats Park in 2020.
- Interactive map of Bohemian Flats Park
- Type: Urban park
- Location: Minneapolis, Minnesota, United States
- Coordinates: 44.975278°N 93.241389°W
- Status: Open all year
- Website: Bohemian Flats

Bohemian Flats Park is a park in Minneapolis, Minnesota, United States on the west bank of the Mississippi River near the Washington Avenue Bridge and next to the University of Minnesota campus.

The area, once known as Little Bohemia, was the site of a shanty town as Minneapolis was incorporated in 1867. European immigrants seeking employment in the city or at the mills at the nearby St. Anthony Falls settled there. The city of Minneapolis gradually dismantled the settlement starting in the 1910s and 20s.

The former housing structures and historic buildings no longer remain. The park is managed by the Minneapolis Park and Recreation Board as part of the Mississippi Gorge Regional Park, and it lies within the Mississippi National River Recreation Area.

== History ==
=== Immigrant groups ===
The area known as "Bohemian Flats" was so named because a high percentage of the population came from Central Europe; the majority of the families occupying the area were Slovaks, Swedes, Czechs (Bohemians), and Germans. The census of 1900 shows the demographics of the area. Despite the name, the people who lived in Bohemian Flats were mostly Slovaks. A predominantly Bohemian community, from what is now the Czech Republic, lived in the Upper Levee in St. Paul before moving to the neighborhood around West 7th Street, where the Czech-Slovak Protective Society (CSPS) Hall still stands at the corner of Michigan Street. The Bohemians were followed by Italian immigrants to the Upper Levee. Many of these families moved to neighborhoods around West 7th Street and Payne Avenue, but Italian communities continued to occupy the Upper Levee and Swede Hollow until the houses were razed by the city in the 1950s.

Origin	North of Bridge	South of Bridge
Slovaks	613	22
Swedes	123	85
Czech	90	105
Irish	41	8
Norwegian	27	2
German	5	23

Obviously, there were oceans and whole continents lying between this place and the area above, even though only a bridge separates them.

Because it was a melting pot of nationalities, Bohemian Flats was known by other names as well. In early times, it was known as "The Danish Flats", due to Danish population. Later it would be called Little Bohemia, Connemara Patch, Little Ireland, Little Lithuania, Cabbage Patch, and in the spring time, it was known as Little Venice. With all of the different nationalities, many "mini" communities were formed.

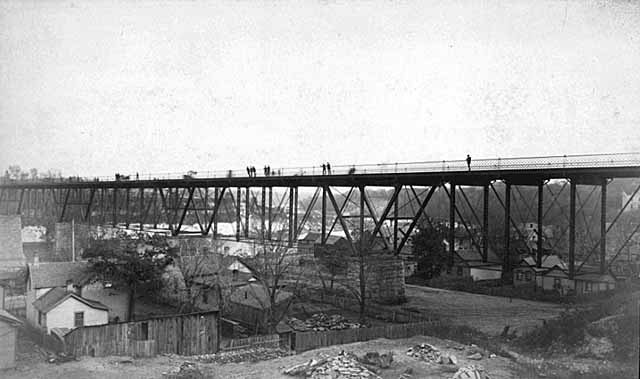
Bohemian Flats below the Washington Avenue Bridge in Minneapolis, Minnesota, c. 1885. Photographer: F. M. Laraway

Many of the flats residents worked at the Heinrich Brewery at the south end or the Noerenberg Brewery (1870) at the north end of the flats. Others worked in the sawmills and flour mills farther upstream. The St. Paul and Pacific Railroad bridge (1887) and the original Washington Avenue bridge (1884) went over the flats with houses directly beneath. The residents of the flats were responsible for establishing churches in Northeast Minneapolis, Cedar-Riverside, and Prospect Park, and traveled to the city center and beyond for their jobs. Members of the community likely attended Americanization classes at nearby centers, such as the Pillsbury House in Cedar-Riverside or the Seven Corners Library.

The population of the Flats grew to over 1,000 residents at its height. Due to proximity and affordability, settling on the Flats was an advantage to the immigrants who worked at the nearby mills and breweries. Residents were also able to retrieve lumber that fell into the river to build their homes or to sell for additional income.

The homes built on the Flats were no more than shanties. They had no foundation and the structures were often faulty . The Mississippi was known to flood in the spring, which was a problem for the dwellings, because the Flats were not much higher than the normal river level. Each spring the water would rise and flood the area, many times taking the poorly constructed houses with the receding waters. For those at the Bohemian Flats, spring floods often meant packing up your belongings and temporarily living with friends or family; there were even reports of the residents camping out in the abandoned Noerenberg Brewery until the water subsided. The river would also carry belongings away, including sheds and wood piles, and chickens would be found drowned after the water receded. One of the most devastating floods in the Twin Cities area took place in April 1952, leading to the evacuation of the entire Upper Levee community and portions of the West Side Flats.

=== Structure and changes ===
The Flats comprised three major areas: the upper flats, and the north and south lower flats. The houses on the upper flats were popular and in high demand because they were not affected by the flood waters in the spring. The upper and lower flats were separated by a cliff. Houses on the upper flats rented for about $15–20 a year, compared to the lower flats which ranged from $.50–2.00. Reaching the lower flats required a descent of 79 stairs. The upper flats had more room than the lower flats, comparatively. By 1885 the west side flats were covered with small, frame dwellings from the foot of 2 1/2 Street South to the foot of 20th Avenue South. By 1892 formal streets had appeared, which were named Wood, Cooper, and Mill reflecting the occupations of many of the residents.

In 1890, the St. Anthony Falls Water Power Company ordered that the City of Minneapolis stop dumping their garbage directly into the Mississippi River, giving them only a few days to find a new place to dispose of waste. Barred access to the river, Dr. Kilvington, head of the Minneapolis Board of Health, and his sanitation committee found a loophole by depositing trash on the banks of the Mississippi instead. It was determined that the flats beneath the Washington Avenue bridge would provide a satisfactory location for the dump, "away from the settled city." This facility, described in an appropriately titled Minneapolis Tribune article about the flats called "Life at the Dump," was extremely hazardous to the health of the residents at the Bohemian Flats. In 1899, the State Board of Health ordered Kilvington's replacement, C.T. Frane, to find a new location for the city dump, after closing the location at the flats. This article noted that city residents had been dumping their "cess-pools" (toilet waste) beneath the bridge in addition to trash.

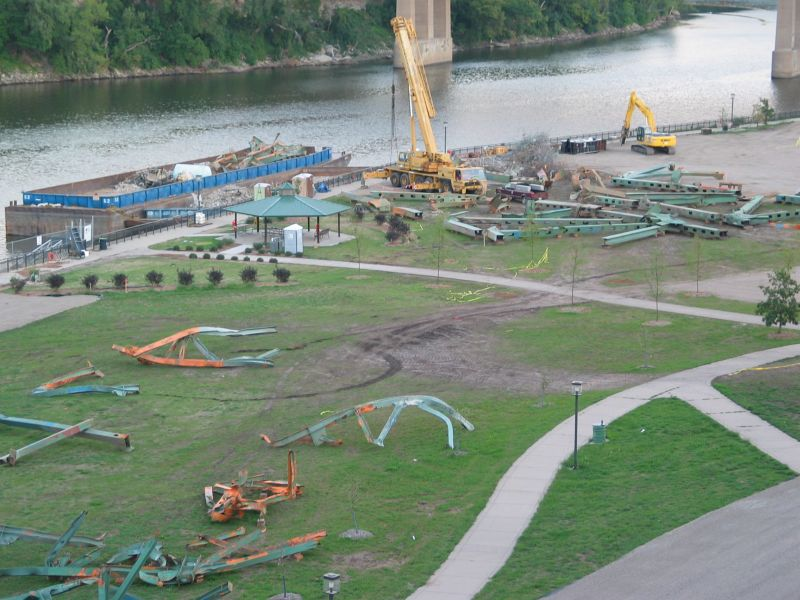
The Bohemian Flats area being used to study structural members of the collapsed I-35W Mississippi River bridge, which was about 150 yards (140 m) upriver

Minneapolis had long wanted to move the head of commercial navigation on the Mississippi from St. Paul to Minneapolis. They succeeded with the opening of Lock and Dam No. 1, which extended commercial navigation to the west bank just above the Washington Ave. bridge - Bohemian flats. In 1915, some residents were issued eviction notices in anticipation of the completion of Lock and Dam No. 1 in 1917. In 1931 the city evicted the residents of Bohemian Flats just north of the municipal levee and built a coal barge facility. In 1935 a brick terminal building was built at the northern end of the municipal levee with an adjoining railroad yard. A concrete grain loading facility was constructed near the southern end of the levee by Archer, Daniels, Midland Company. The houses on the intermediate terrace were removed shortly after. Eminent domain was used by the city to force evacuations of the area. The last resident of the Flats stayed until the construction of the current Washington Avenue Bridge in 1963. Joseph A. Kieferle, 80, had called the Flats home for fifty years. A lone abandoned house remained in the shadow of a Great Northern Oil tank until the late 1960s. In the 1940s a large brick building was built for housing single men who worked at the mills. This building was soon inhabited by families. The community began to use this building as a community center.

=== 21st century ===
On August 1, 2007, the I-35W Bridge collapsed, killing 13 people and injuring 145. Much of the bridge debris was temporarily stored at the Bohemian Flats as part of the ongoing investigation of the collapse; it was removed to a storage facility in Afton, Minnesota, in the fall of 2010. The flats area was used as a construction staging area for contractors renovating the nearby Franklin Bridge in 2015–2016.

== Bohemian Flats Park ==
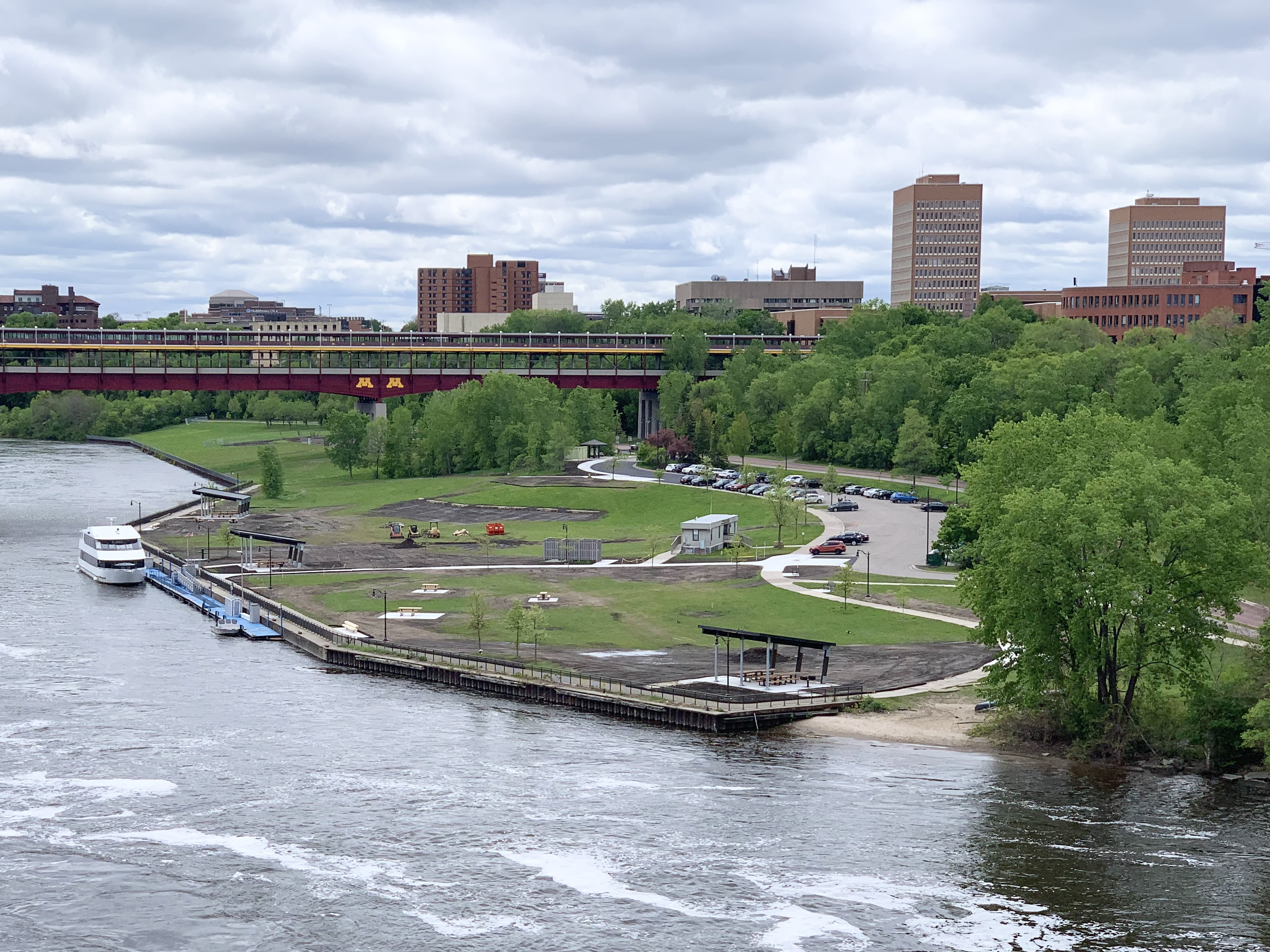
New picnic shelters under construction in 2019.

Bohemian Flats is a public park in Minneapolis that is part of the Mississippi Gorge Regional Park, a unit of the Minneapolis Park and Recreation Board. Recreational amenities at Bohemian Flats include biking path, garden, picnic areas, river cruises/private charters, and restroom facilities.

== Bohemian Day ==
Bohemian Day on August 20 was organized by artists and Bohemian Gera Pobuda to celebrate the traditions as well as the immigrants who lived in the Bohemian Flats during the first three decades of the 20th century. These immigrants included Czechs, Slovaks, Germans, Scandinavians, Irish, and Italians. The Lipa Slovak Dancers dress in traditional costumes all made by a woman from Slovakia. The Lipa Slovak group is named after the national tree of Slovakia, the linden tree in North America. They perform several times per year at events such as Czech festivals and the Festival of Nations.

== See also ==
- History of Minneapolis
