= Winchell =

Winchell is a surname. It may refer to:

== People ==
- Alexander Winchell (1824–1891), American geologist
- Alexander Newton Winchell (1874–1958), American geologist
- April Winchell, actress, writer, host and commentator
- Barry Winchell, infantryman in the U.S. Army linked to the "don't ask, don't tell" policy
- Charlotte S. Winchell (1836-1926), American civic leader
- Constance Winchell, reference librarian
- Danny Winchell, entertainer
- Horace Vaughn Winchell (1865–1923), American geologist
- Lynn Winchell, former Playboy Playmate of the Month
- Mark Royden Winchell (1948–2008), biographer, essayist, historian and literary critic
- Newton Horace Winchell (1839–1914), American geologist
- Paul Winchell, ventriloquist, inventor of the artificial heart
- Steve Winchell, fictional character in The OA
- Verne Winchell, founder of Winchell's Donuts
- Walter Winchell, journalist

== Other ==
- Winchell McKendree Craig (1892–1960), American neurosurgeon
- Winchell Smith (1871–1933), American playwright
- Winchell (film), a 1998 biopic of Walter Winchell
- Winchell, Texas
- Winchell's Donuts, a donut company
- Mount Winchell, California
- Winchell Lake, a lake in Minnesota
- Winchell Trail, a hiking path in Minneapolis
