= Minnehaha Falls Lower Glen Trail =

Hiking area in Minneapolis

Coordinates: 44°54′53″N 93°12′28″W

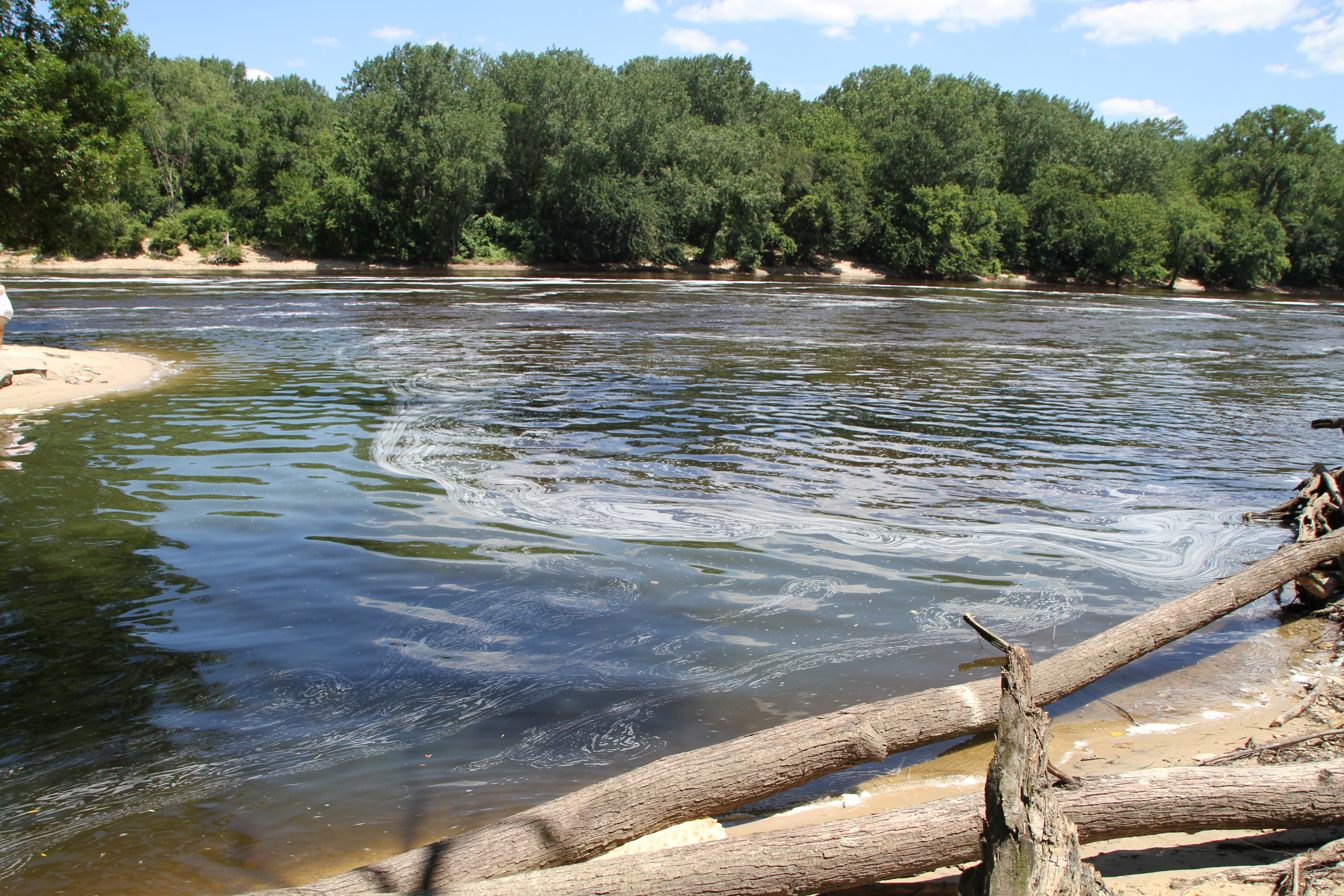
- In summer, the confluence of Minnehaha Creek and the Mississippi River at a sandy beach.
- Length: 2.1 mi (3.4 km)
- Location: Minneapolis, Minnesota, United States
- Trailheads: Base of the falls; Glens area; South plateau area
- Use: Hiking only
- Difficulty: Easy
- Season: Year round
- Sights: Minnehaha Creek; Minnehaha Falls; Mississippi River gorge; Forests, swamps & wildflowers
- Hazards: Muddy after rains; Fast moving creek; Icy in winter

Minnehaha Falls Lower Glen Trail is a popular hiking route in Minneapolis, Minnesota, United States. The 2.1-mile (3.4 km) trail loop begins and ends at the base of the iconic Minnehaha Falls. Hikers follow natural trails and elevated boardwalks through a sedimentary rock glen carved by Minnehaha Creek to its confluence with the Mississippi River where there is a sandy beach. Portions of the trail loop are rated moderate to challenging in difficulty.

== Route description ==
Minnehaha lower glen is the canyon area downstream from Minnehaha Falls to where Minnehaha Creek flows to its end at the Mississippi River. Main access to the hiking trail loop is via several staircases near Minnehaha Falls that descend to the lower glen floor. After descending staircases into the glen, hikers traverse dirt trails that eventually follow both sides of the creek, with gradual elevation change to the Mississippi River. At 686 feet (209 m) above sea level, the confluence area is the lowest point of elevation in Minneapolis. For safety reasons, the park closes staircases in winter. Alternative and year-round access to the hiking trail loop is possible via the Glens Area by Godfrey Parkway or the South Plateau Area by a dog park.

The trail on the north side of the creek is mostly rated moderate in difficulty, while the south side trail is considered more challenging. Some sections of the trail have boardwalks over ponds and muddy terrain. There are five numbered pedestrian bridges in the park, with numbers 2-5 in the lower glen, that allow hikers to traverse the creek.

Key features and sites on the hike:

- Abandoned falls grassy glen area
- Black ash swamp
- Godfrey Mill ruins
- Historic stone bridge and wall structures
- Natural wading pool area
- Platteville Limestone bluffs
- Sandy beachhead
- Wildlife

== History of the trail ==
The hiking loop trail is entirely within Minnehaha Regional Park that is managed by Minneapolis Park and Recreation Board. The 54-acre lower glen area that hikers traverse was once considered neglected. By 2010, Minnehaha Creek Watershed District spent $7 million toward restoration efforts such as trail improvements, shoreline stabilization, invasive plant removal, boardwalk replacement, and reconstruction of stone wall and bridge structures. In 2014, a heavy rain event threatened improvements to the glen, which were not designed to handle record levels of precipitation.

== See also ==
- Fort Snelling State Park
- Grand Rounds National Scenic Byway
- Lock and Dam No. 1
- Minnehaha Trail
- Mississippi National River and Recreation Area
- Upper Mississippi River
- Winchell Trail
