= Charles Peter Berkey =

American geologist (1867–1955)

Charles Peter Berkey (March 25, 1867 – April 22, 1955) was an American geologist, notable as a founder of the discipline of engineering geology, for his work on the great dams of the 1930s, and as chief geologist on the Gobi Desert expeditions in Mongolia led by Roy Chapman Andrews in the 1920s.

== Early life and education ==
Born in Goshen, Indiana, Berkey grew up on farms in Indiana, then Texas, and ultimately Minnesota, graduating from Farmington High School. He enrolled in the University of Minnesota in 1889, receiving his undergraduate degree in 1892 and continuing to receive a Ph.D. in geology in 1897 (the first to be awarded by the university). His teachers included Newton Horace Winchell (whose son, Alexander Newton Winchell he later himself taught). Berkey's thesis became the foundational reference for the study of the Dalles of the St. Croix River, a scenic area of 60 square miles on the Minnesota-Wisconsin boundary.

== Career ==
Berkey remained as an instructor at the University of Minnesota until 1903, when he was recruited by professor James Kemp to Columbia University in New York City. The timing was propitious, because Kemp had just become a consultant to the Catskill Project of the city's Board of Water Supply. This was a monumental engineering project involving the creation of large dams, 90 miles of aqueduct, drilling a total of three vertical miles of access shafts, all with the aim of diverting of a huge water flow to a tunnel under the Hudson River and thus to the city. Soon after the arrival of his younger colleague, Kemp withdrew from the project and Berkey took his place.

During the Catskill Project's nearly two decades of construction, to the mid-1920s, Berkey became, in effect, the country's leading engineering geologist—although that term was not yet in use. The new field's name came to exist only after the catastrophic failure of the St. Francis Dam in Los Angeles County, California, in 1928 killed more than 400 people. Engineering geologists were then in high demand and short supply. Berkey was appointed by President Coolidge to the board tasked to approve the design of Hoover Dam. His responsibility was to assess that the rock walls and floor of the Colorado River would be able to hold the dam's enormous pressure. He was also an advisor to the construction of the Grand Coulee Dam and reservoir and participated in the engineering geological assessments of the Holland and Lincoln tunnels in New York City, the foundations for the George Washington, Whitestone, and Triboro bridges, and, in the west, the Friant, Shasta, Bonneville, and Parker dams.

Berkey was Chief Geologist and Petrographer on the Central Asiatic Expeditions of the American Museum of Natural History, famously led by Roy Chapman Andrews in 1922, 1923, and 1925. Berkey's insistence that the expedition's photographer hike over some hills to record an unusual geological feature led instead to the latter's discovery of the field of fossils that included the famous fossil dinosaur eggs, a find for which Berkey, as a geologist, never claimed credit, later admitting that he "never thought too much about the eggs". His book, "The Geology of Mongolia" is still reprinted as a classic. He was elected to the National Academy of Sciences in 1927, cited for his Mongolia work. He was elected to the American Philosophical Society in 1928. In 1950 the Geological Society of America published Application of Geology to Engineering Practice in his honor.

Berkey served for many years as head of Columbia's geology department.

== Retirement ==
He retired from Columbia in 1932 to live with his wife Minnie (née Best) in Palisades, New Jersey. In 1947 he was asked to evaluate several proposed sites for the United Nations and opined that the East River site was "the best place in the world," not for engineering reasons but, "with Grand Central station near-by and the Radio City Music Hall for a movie after a hard day." He was 88 when he died in 1955.
