= Ulysses Sherman Grant =

American geologist (1867–1932)

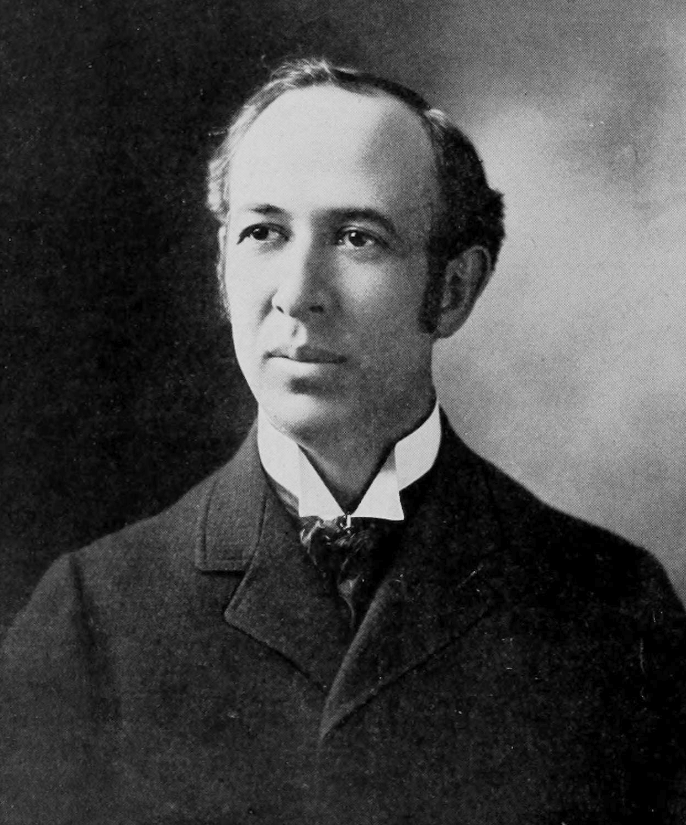
- Born: February 14, 1867; Moline, Illinois
- Died: September 21, 1932 (aged 65); Chicago, Illinois
- Education: University of Minnesota
- Occupation: Geologist
- Spouse: Avis Winchell (m. 1891)
- Children: 4
- Relatives: Newton Horace Winchell (father-in-law); Charlotte Winchell (mother-in-law); Horace Vaughn Winchell (brother-in-law); Ima Winchell Stacy (sister-in-law)

Ulysses Sherman Grant (February 14, 1867 – September 21, 1932) was an American geologist. He was the son of Lewis A. Grant and Mary Helen Pierce.

== Biography ==
Ulysses Sherman Grant was born in Moline, Illinois on February 14, 1867. He graduated from the University of Minnesota with B.S. in 1888, and received a Ph.D. from Johns Hopkins University in 1893. He married Avis Winchell in 1891, and they had four children.

From 1893 to 1899, Grant was an Assistant State Geologist (at the Geological and Natural History Survey of Minnesota, co-authoring several of its yearly reports) at the University of Minnesota. He was also an Instructor in Geology (1897-1898), and one of the editors of journal The American Geologist, founded by his mentor Newton Winchell in 1888.

In 1899, he became professor of geology at Northwestern University. He soon became the chairman of the geology department, a position he held until his death.

In 1899, Professor Grant inspected the Brule, Wisconsin area for ancient copper deposits.

He died in Chicago on September 21, 1932.
