= Newton Lake =

Newton Lake may refer to:

- Newton Lake State Fish and Wildlife Area, a protected area in Illinois
- Newton Lake (Lake County, Minnesota), a lake in Minnesota
