= Alexander Newton Winchell =

American geologist and mineralogist (1874–1958)

Alexander Newton Winchell (2 March 1874 - 7 June 1958) was an American geologist who pioneered spectroscopic and X-ray crystallographic studies on minerals. He wrote an influential textbook, the Elements of optical mineralogy which went into several editions.

Winchell was born in Minneapolis to Newton Horace and Charlotte Sophia. He was educated at the University of Minnesota with a BS in 1896 and MS in 1897 under Charles Peter Berkey. He then studied in Paris under Alfred Lacroix receiving a DSc in 1900. He then joined the Montana School of Mines and later the University of Wisconsin. He worked on applications of X-ray crystallography to mineralogy, working with Linus Pauling, W.H. Taylor and W.L. Bragg. He also consulted for the US Geological Survey, the American Cyanamid Company and was a visiting professor at the University of Virginia and Columbia University.

Winchell married Clare Edith Christello in 1898 and they had five children, several of whom continued in geology. After the death of Clare in 1932, he married his first cousin once removed Florence Mabel Sylvester (granddaughter of Alexander Winchell). He received the Roebling medal of the Mineralogical Society of America in 1955.
