= Newton Lake (Lake County, Minnesota) =

Lake of the United States of America

- Location within Minnesota
- Location: Lake County, Minnesota
- Coordinates: 47°59′0″N 91°43′24″W
- Type: lake

Newton Lake is a lake in Lake County, in the U.S. state of Minnesota.

Newton Lake was named for Newton Horace Winchell, a geologist.

== See also ==
- List of lakes in Minnesota
