= Meeker Island Lock and Dam =

Coordinates: 44°57′14″N 93°12′28″W

- Lock and Dam No. 2
- U.S. National Register of Historic Places
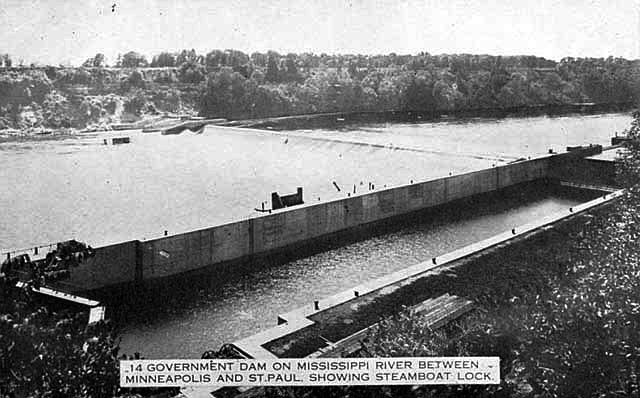
- The Meeker Island Lock and Dam c. 1910
- Location: Minneapolis and Saint Paul, Minnesota
- Built: 1899–1907
- Architect: U.S. Army Corps of Engineers
- NRHP reference No.: 03000522
- Added to NRHP: June 13, 2003

The Meeker Island Lock and Dam (originally known as Lock and Dam No. 2) was the first lock and dam facility built on the Upper Mississippi River. Meeker Island was named after its owner, Judge Bradley B. Meeker, whom Meeker County is also named after. Following a construction period lasting eight years, the site was only in operation from 1907 to 1912 when the growing interest in hydroelectric power led to design and construction of today's Lock and Dam No. 1 a few miles downriver. It was realized that the new dam could take over the function provided by this first site and another small dam a short distance downriver.

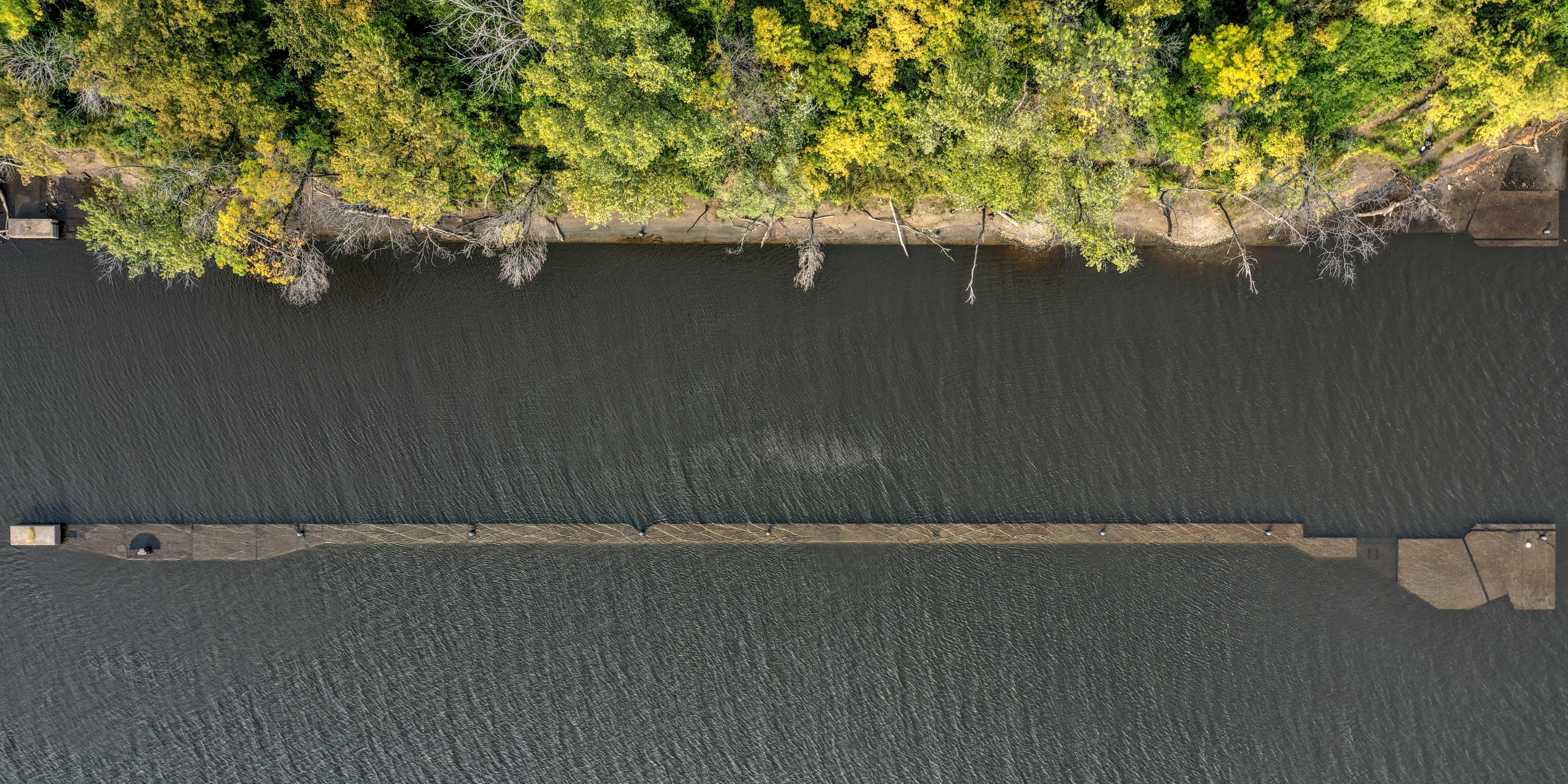
The remains as viewed from above in 2020

Lock and Dam No. 1 opened in 1917, and a hydroelectric plant was added there in the 1920s to power the Ford Motor Company's Twin Cities Assembly Plant. The Meeker Island dam was demolished, although some ruins of the lock remain. Tops of the old lock walls become visible during low water periods on the river. It is located in the Desnoyer Park neighborhood, north of the Lake Street-Marshall Bridge connecting Minneapolis and Saint Paul, Minnesota.

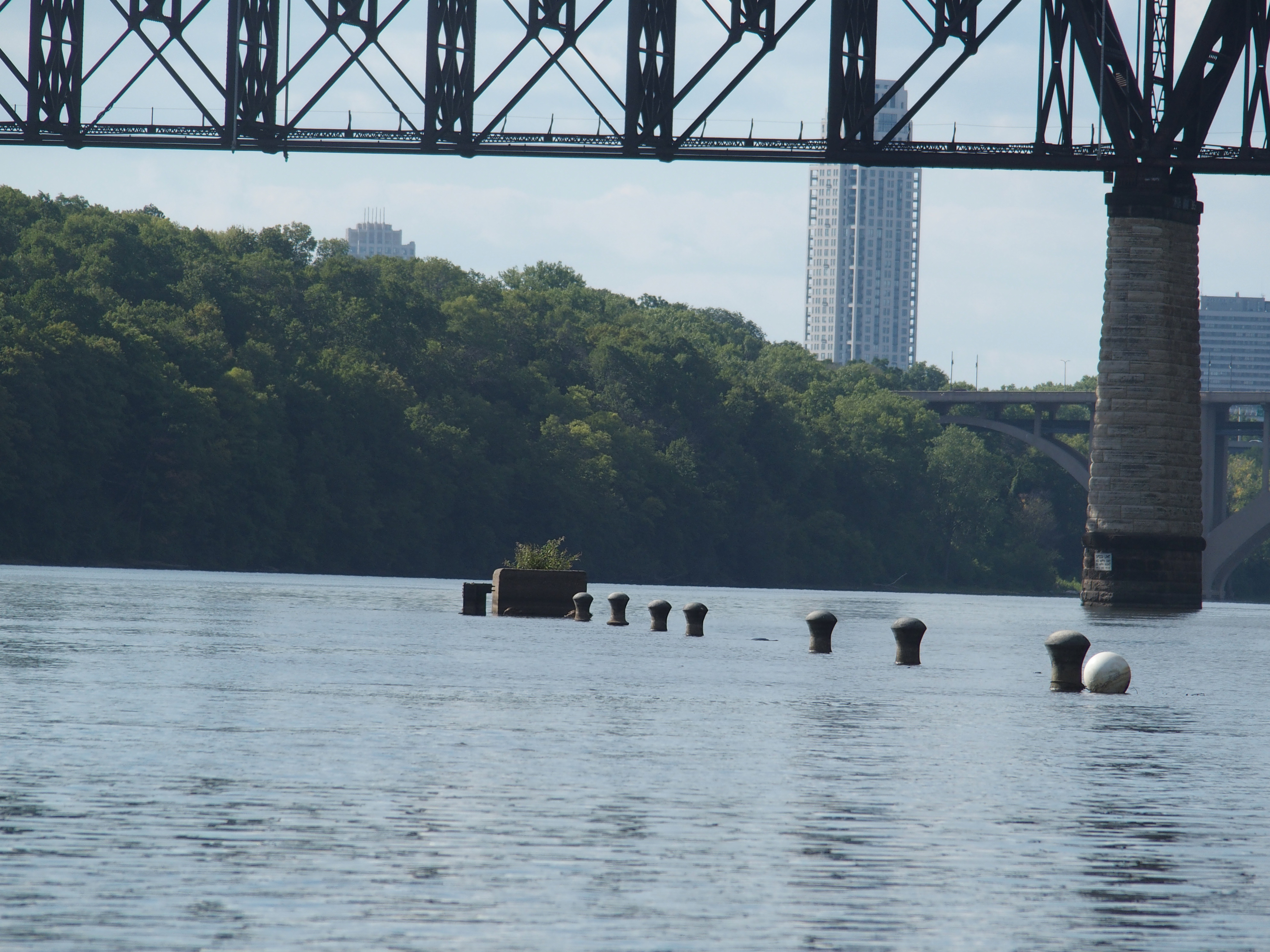
Ruins of the Meeker Island Lock as seen from the river in 2022

The Meeker Island Lock and Dam ruins were added to the National Register of Historic Places in 2003.

Each year, National Park Service historian Dr. John Anfinson and the Friends of the Mississippi River lead a tour of the lock and dam ruins.

In 2005 a $380,000 restoration project began to create a public park near the dam. It was finished in 2007.

The historic dam site and off-leash dog park are part of the Mississippi River Gorge Regional Park.
