= Twin Cities Assembly Plant =

Former Ford automobile manufacturing site in Saint Paul

Coordinates: 44°54′50″N 93°11′45″W

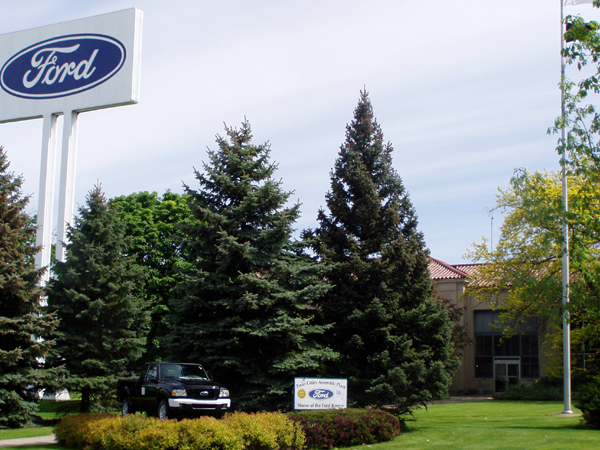
- Ford Twin Cities assembly plant
- Operated: 1925–2011
- Location: 966 South Mississippi River Boulevard; Saint Paul, Minnesota, United States
- Industry: Automotive
- Products: Ford Ranger
- Employees: 925 (2011)
- Area: 140 acres (0.57 km^{2})
- Volume: 2,144,932 square feet (199,270.7 m^{2})
- Owner: Ford Motor Company

The Twin Cities Assembly Plant was a Ford Motor Company manufacturing facility in Saint Paul, Minnesota, United States, that operated from 1925 to 2011. In 1912, Ford's first assembly and sales activities in Minnesota began in a former warehouse in Minneapolis. By 1925, Ford had relocated its local operations to the bluffs above the Mississippi River in the Highland Park in the neighborhood of Saint Paul. In 2006, Ford officials announced plans to close the factory, though it operated for three years past the 2008 closure date initially announced. At the time of its closure, it was the oldest Ford plant in continuous operation. The plant's final truck was completed on December 16, 2011. All of the facility's buildings were demolished and the site underwent extensive environmental remediation in the late 2010s, paid by Ford. Following a multi-year planning and community engagement process, the site was sold to the Ryan Companies, who began redevelopment of the site in 2020 as Highland Bridge, a 122-acre residential and commercial district.

== History ==
Ford had assembly plants in both Minneapolis and St. Paul. They became functionally obsolete with the development of the moveable assembly line The Ford Center, at 420 Fifth St. in Minneapolis, was the tallest automobile factory at the time of its opening in 1912. It is currently in use as an office building.

=== Construction ===
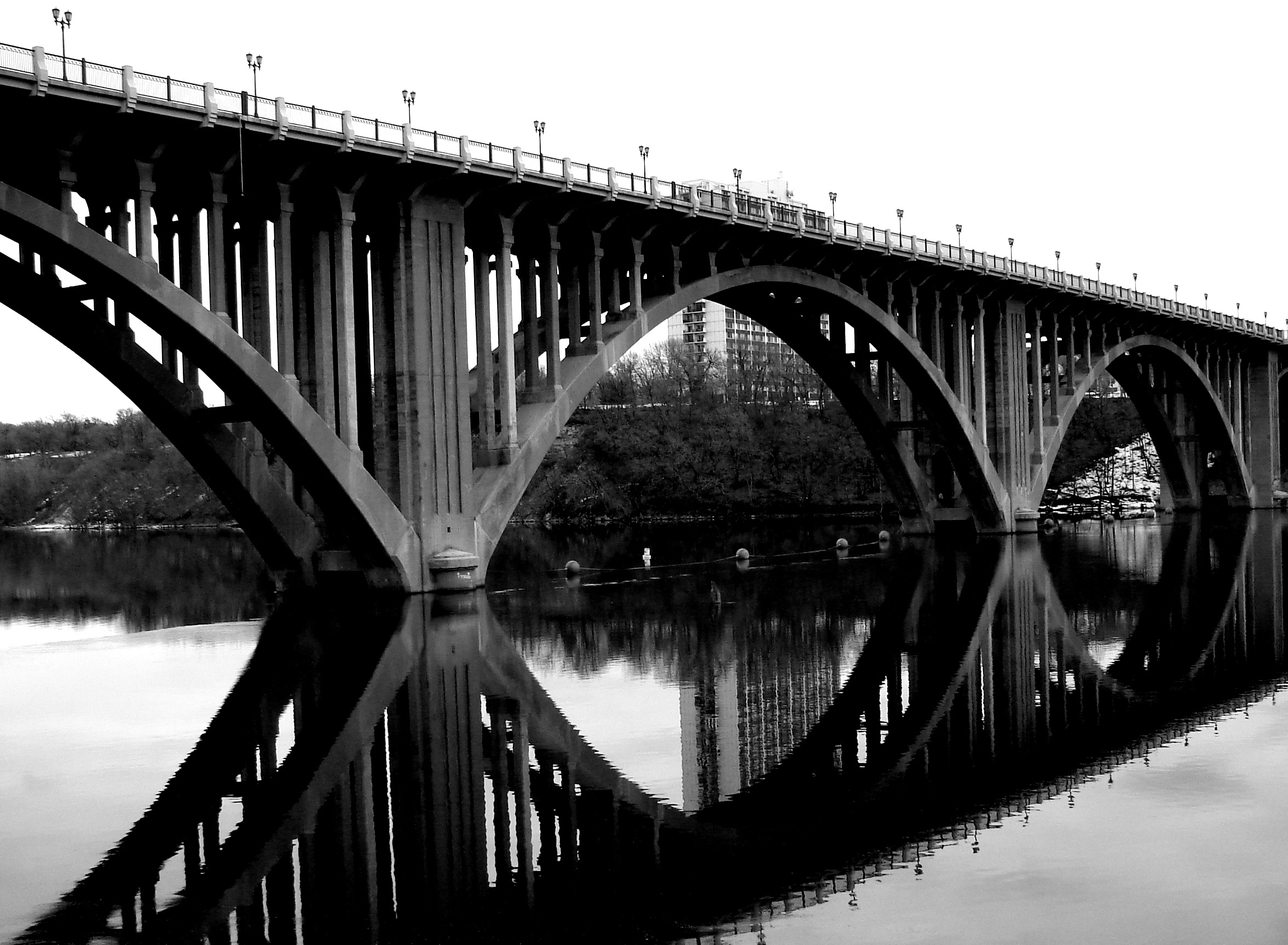
A view of the Intercity Bridge

The promise of cheap hydropower was the chief reason why Henry Ford agreed to build a plant in Saint Paul. The Ford Dam was initially completed in 1917, making it one of the oldest on the river. However, hydroelectric power required a rather large dam, which meant that the first lock and dam built on the Mississippi would have to be demolished. Some remains of the upstream Meeker Island Lock and Dam still poke out of the water when the river is low. A major upgrade to the Ford Dam was completed in 1929, and the completion of locks by the U.S. Army Corps of Engineers followed in 1932. The dam was acquired by Brookfield Renewable Power in April 2008.

The Ford name is also attached to a nearby bridge, completed in 1927. Officially known as the Intercity Bridge, it connects 46th Street on the Minneapolis side of the river to the Ford Parkway in Saint Paul.

=== Glass production ===
From 1926 to 1959, the plant produced glass for vehicle windows with silica mined from sandstone on site. The resulting tunnels underneath the plant remain.

=== Closure ===
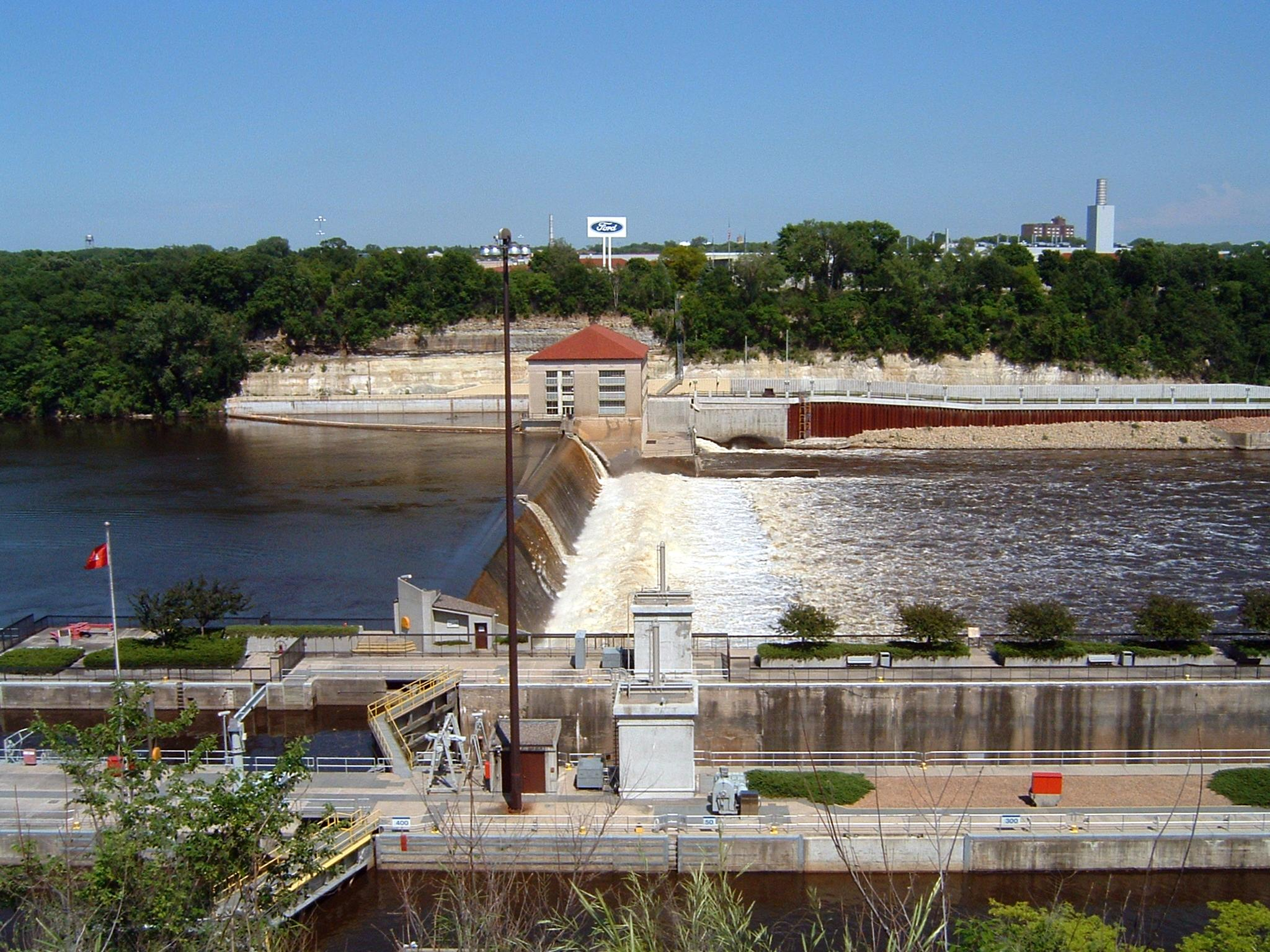
A dam below the Twin Cities Assembly Plant supplied it with hydro-electric power

In 2004, a vehicle took an average of 20.77 hours of labor to roll through the assembly line, 3.5 hours faster than might be expected in comparison to other plants.

The plant was rumored to be among the plants that were expected to be closed when company officials revealed restructuring plans dubbed The Way Forward on January 23, 2006. The Saint Paul plant was not included among the initial list of plant closings announced in January. However, Ford announced on April 13 that the Twin Cities plant would close in 2008, along with the Norfolk, Virginia Ford F-series pickup plant.

Ranger production had dropped from a peak of nearly 300,000 units in 1998, to under 120,000 in 2005. First quarter 2006 sales for the Ranger were under 22,500—down another 16% from 2005. While other Ford plants were operating at an average capacity of 75% in 2004, the Twin Cities Plant beat that average with 83%, but higher than average productivity was not enough to hold off the plant's ultimate closure.

On July 24, 2008, Ford announced they would keep the Twin Cities Plant open through 2011. The plant produced its last vehicle on December 16, 2011 and has been closed.

=== Redevelopment ===
Ford announced plans to tear down most of the building on the site, beginning in the summer of 2012. Redevelopment plans will depend on the findings of pollution tests. Cleanup efforts were completed by mid-2019. Ownership is in the process of changing to a local developer whose plans include 3800 residential units, along with commercial and retail units, spanning 122 acres. Not included in the transfer of ownership is an additional area owned by Ford abutting the Mississippi River and a set of railroad spurs owned by Canadian Pacific (formerly the Milwaukee Road and Soo Line Railroad), both requiring further cleanup.

== Products ==
The plant's final product was the Ranger pickup truck. Previously, the plant had manufactured the Ford Model T, Model TT truck, Ford Model A, Sportsman convertible, Galaxie, and LTD.

== See also ==
- List of former automotive manufacturing plants
- List of Ford factories
- Lock and Dam No. 1
