= Ima Winchell Stacy =

American educator (1867–1923)

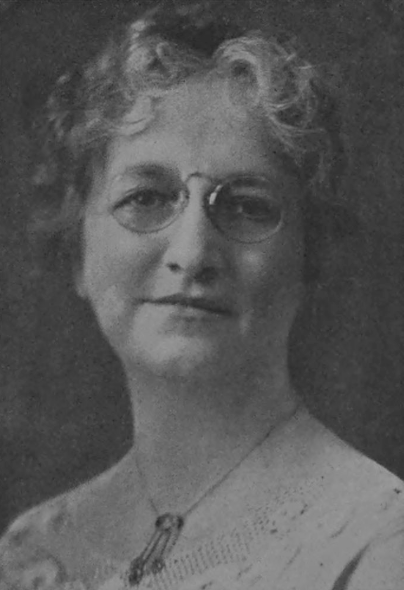
- Photo in Who's who Among Minnesota Women
- Born: Ima Caroline Winchell; May 22, 1867; Colon, Michigan, U.S.
- Died: August 11, 1923 (aged 56); Washington, D.C., U.S.
- Education: University of Minnesota
- Occupation: Educator
- Known for: National figure in the training and welfare of the young women employed by the Dayton Company of Minneapolis.
- Parent(s): Newton Horace Winchell, Charlotte Winchell
- Relatives: Horace Vaughn Winchell (brother); Ulysses Sherman Grant (brother-in-law)

Ima Winchell Stacy (May 22, 1867 – August 11, 1923) was an American educator from Michigan who became known for her work in retail education and personnel training. She moved to Minneapolis as a child, and graduated from the University of Minnesota before beginning her career as a teacher. Stacy directed the education and personnel programs at the Dayton Company in Minneapolis, where she developed one of the first formal salesmanship training schools in the United States. In 1919, she joined the faculty of New York University’s School of Retailing, where she organized and led programs in salesmanship and retail training. She was also active in civic, religious, and alumni organizations, and supported woman suffrage.

== Early life and education ==
Ima Caroline Winchell was born at Colon, Michigan, on May 22, 1867. She came to Minneapolis in 1872, when her father, Newton Horace Winchell, was appointed state geologist and a professor at the University of Minnesota. Her mother was Charlotte Sophia Imus. Stacy's siblings were: Horace Vaughn, Avis (Mrs. Ulysses Sherman Grant), Alexander Newton, and Lottie Louise.

She graduated with highest honors from the university in 1888. In her junior year, she was a member of the Delta Gamma sorority; member of the staff which issued the first Gopher; and editor of the Anchora, the sorority magazine.

== Career ==
After graduation, Stacy taught in the Owatonna Senior High School and in evening classes at the YWCA.

When the Dayton's opened the first salesmanship school in Minneapolis, Stacy was placed in charge of the work. She started in to learn the work from the ground up, making many trips to New York City and spending two summers studying at Columbia University. For seven years, she was both Personnel and Welfare Director in the Dayton Company, and conducted an Education Department which included a regular three years' graded course recognized by the Board of Education.

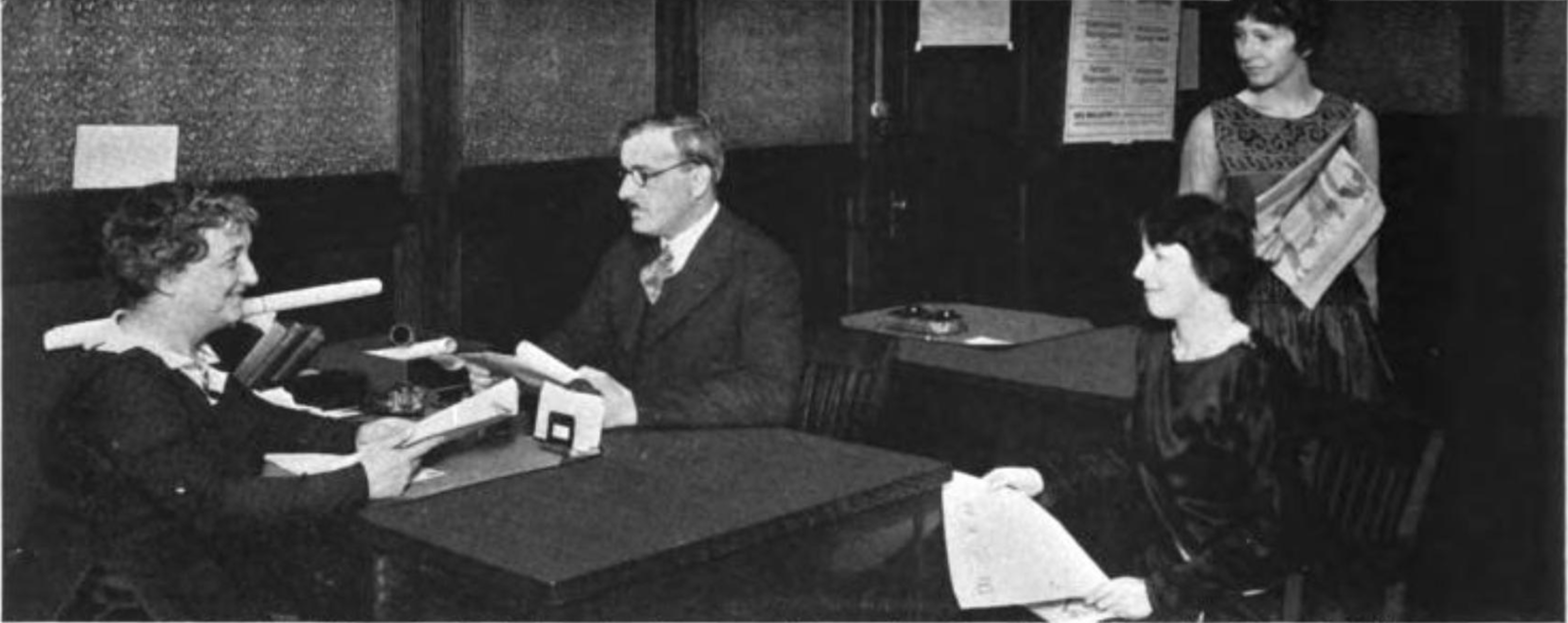
Stacy, far left, in 1920

The Personnel Department of the Dayton Company, which was one of the first to join the Retail Research Association, acquired such an enviable reputation that the New York University (NYU) School of Retailing invited Stacy to join the faculty in the department of commerce. She relocated to the East Coast in 1919 and started the new job in that year. It entailed the teaching of salesmanship, store organization, and methods of training, as well as the placing of the students in stores for practice experience. She spent most of her time in research work in retail establishments. She planned the courses, made out the bulletin, got the teachers, and shouldered the full burden of executive duties for the first summer school devoted to the teaching of retail selling in 1920. NYU awarded her a Master of Arts degree three years later in appreciation of her work.

After three years at NYU, Stacy moved to Philadelphia to become Sales Supervisor at Strawbridge & Clothier.

Stacy served as Vice President of the New York Club, and served on the Board of the General Alumni Association of the University of Minnesota. She favored woman suffrage and served on the local committee when the National American Woman Suffrage Association held its annual meeting at the First Baptist Church, Minneapolis on May 30 to June 5, 1901.

== Personal life ==
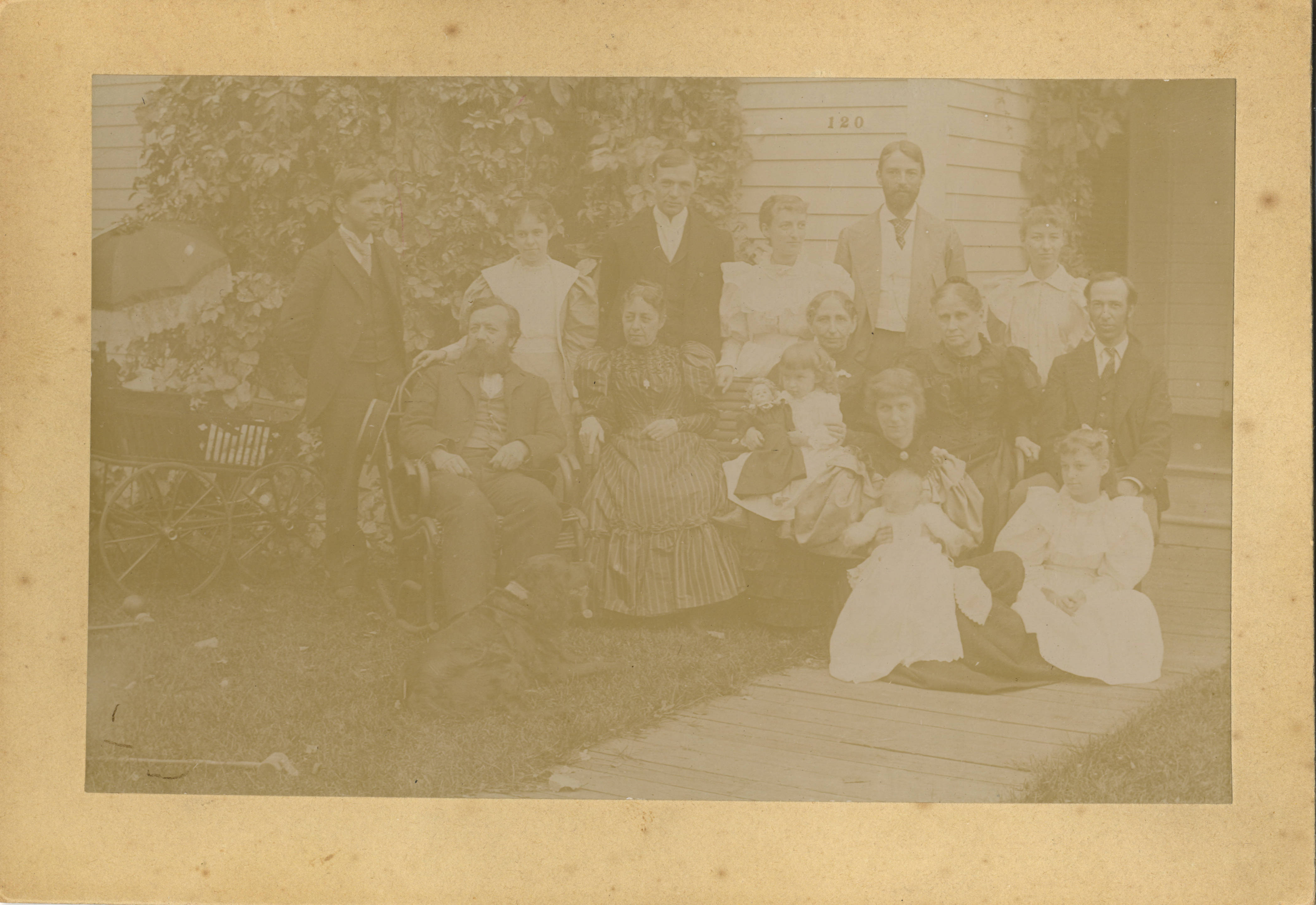
Winchell family. Ima is in the back row, fourth from the left.

On October 25, 1889, she married Francis N. Stacy (d. 1951), a writer and journalist, who was also a professor the University of Minnesota.

David Draper Dayton, son of George Dayton, was Stacy's brother-in-law.

Since her early life, Stacy was an active worker in the Methodist Episcopal Church, and was sent as a lay delegate to the 1922 annual conference at the Arch Street Methodist Church of Philadelphia.

Ima Winchell Stacy died at the Walter Reed Hospital in Washington, D.C., on August 11, 1923. Burial was at Lakewood Cemetery, Minneapolis. She was survived by two daughters and a son. (Note: According to Battle (1922), Stacy went into business when her husband died and left her with a young family to care for. However, Francis Stacy's obituary in the Evening Star (Washington, D.C.) states that he came to Washington, D.C. in 1912, and died there in 1952.)

== Selected works ==
- "Salesmanship Training" (text)
