= Winchell Lake =

Lake in the state of Minnesota, United States

- Location within Minnesota
- Location: Cook County, Minnesota
- Coordinates: 47°59′33″N 90°35′50″W
- Type: lake

Winchell Lake is a lake in Cook County, Minnesota, in the United States. It is most commonly accessed from Brule Lake or Poplar Lake. There are a total of 12 active campsites to choose from, with some even providing fishing opportunities. See complete list here.

Winchell Lake was named for Newton Horace Winchell, a Minnesota geologist.

== See also ==
- List of lakes in Minnesota
