= Charlotte S. Winchell =

- Winchell in 1880
- Born: Charlotte Sophia Imus; May 28, 1836; Shaftsbury, Vermont, U.S.
- Died: March 17, 1926 (aged 89); Benson Springs, Florida
- Education: Albion College
- Occupation: Civic leader
- Employer: Albion College
- Organizations: Woman's Foreign Missionary Society of the Methodist Episcopal Church; Woman's Christian Temperance Union
- Known for: "Mother of temperance education"
- Board member of: Minneapolis board of education
- Spouse: Newton Horace Winchell (m. 1864; died 1914)
- Children: 5, including Horace Vaughn Winchell & Ima Winchell Stacy
- Relatives: Ulysses Sherman Grant (son-in-law)

Charlotte S. Winchell (née Imus; 1836-1926) was an American civic leader associated with education, social reform, and foreign missionary work in Minnesota. She headed the branch work of the Woman's Foreign Missionary Society of the Methodist Episcopal Church in that state, as well as in North Dakota and South Dakota. She served as the first president of the Minnesota Woman's Christian Temperance Union (WCTU), and was characterized as the "Mother of temperance education".

== Early life and education ==
Charlotte Sophia Imus was born in Shaftsbury, Vermont, on May 28, 1836. While still a child, her parents moved to Michigan.

She received her education in Michigan's district schools and graduated from Albion College, at the age of twenty.

== Career ==
Winchell in 1926 obituary

When she was fourteen years old, she taught school in Byron Township, Michigan. After graduating from Albion College, she served on its faculty, teaching seven college subjects.

During the civil war, she founded Soldiers' aid societies.

In 1864, she married Dr. Newton Horace Winchell and came to Minnesota in 1872. (Note: According to Stanton et al., she removed to Minnesota in 1873.) During the years when Prof. Winchell spent his summers afield, studying geology and resources of Minnesota, Mrs. Winchell acted as his secretary, revising proofs of his books and aiding in editing the American Geologist.

Winchell identified herself with the WCTU, served as president of the first union, and later as superintendent of scientific temperance instruction. She worked also with the Independent Order of Good Templars (IOGT). In 1895, she was a delegate to the world convention of the WCTU IN London, and in 1916, she delivered the address of welcome when Minneapolis women were hosts to the national convention. When Governor Andrew Ryan McGill signed the bill which made the teaching of scientific temperance in Minnesota schools a law, he handed the pen with which he signed the bill to Winchell, congratulating her upon her work for temperance, and attributing the passage of the bill to her efforts.

In 1883, she was one of the three founders of the Minneapolis branch of Woman's Foreign Missionary Society of the Methodist Episcopal Church, and served as secretary of its board. Later, she was head of the branch work in Minnesota, North Dakota, and South Dakota. She also directed woman's missionary work in Malaysia, being in contact with work on five continents. For 53 years, she engaged in foreign missionary work.

Winchell was one of the first two women members of the Minneapolis board of education, being elected in April 1876, and serving as secretary. She also took part in the nominations and elections of school officers, and was chair of the committee for introducing temperance text books into the schools.

Winchell was an advocate of suffrage for woman. She was a member of the State and City Suffrage Societies, and of the Association for the Advancement of Women.

== Personal life ==
Winchell had five children, Horace Vaughn Winchell, Ima Winchell Stacy, Alexander, Avis (Mrs. Ulysses Sherman Grant), and Louise (Mrs. Draper Dayton).

== Death and legacy ==
Charlotte Winchell cottage and annex (1915)

Charlotte Winchell died in Benson Springs, Florida, on March 17, 1926.

The Winchells home in Minneapolis on Church Street became known as a resort from the University of Minnesota school grind. It came to be a school home to many who knew of its open house hospitality. In later years, the old home was taken over and made into a cooperative cottage and called Winchell cottage. When campus expansion came, the name was perpetuated in a new structure, which, with its annex, was named Charlotte Winchell cottage and annex. The name was chosen in 1915 by the University of Minnesota Alumnae club to serve as a cooperative home for women students.

The Charlotte Winchell School for Girls in Penang, Malaysia is named in her honor.
