= Lock and Dam No. 1 =

Dam in Minnesota, U.S.

Lock and Dam No. 1 (Ford Dam)
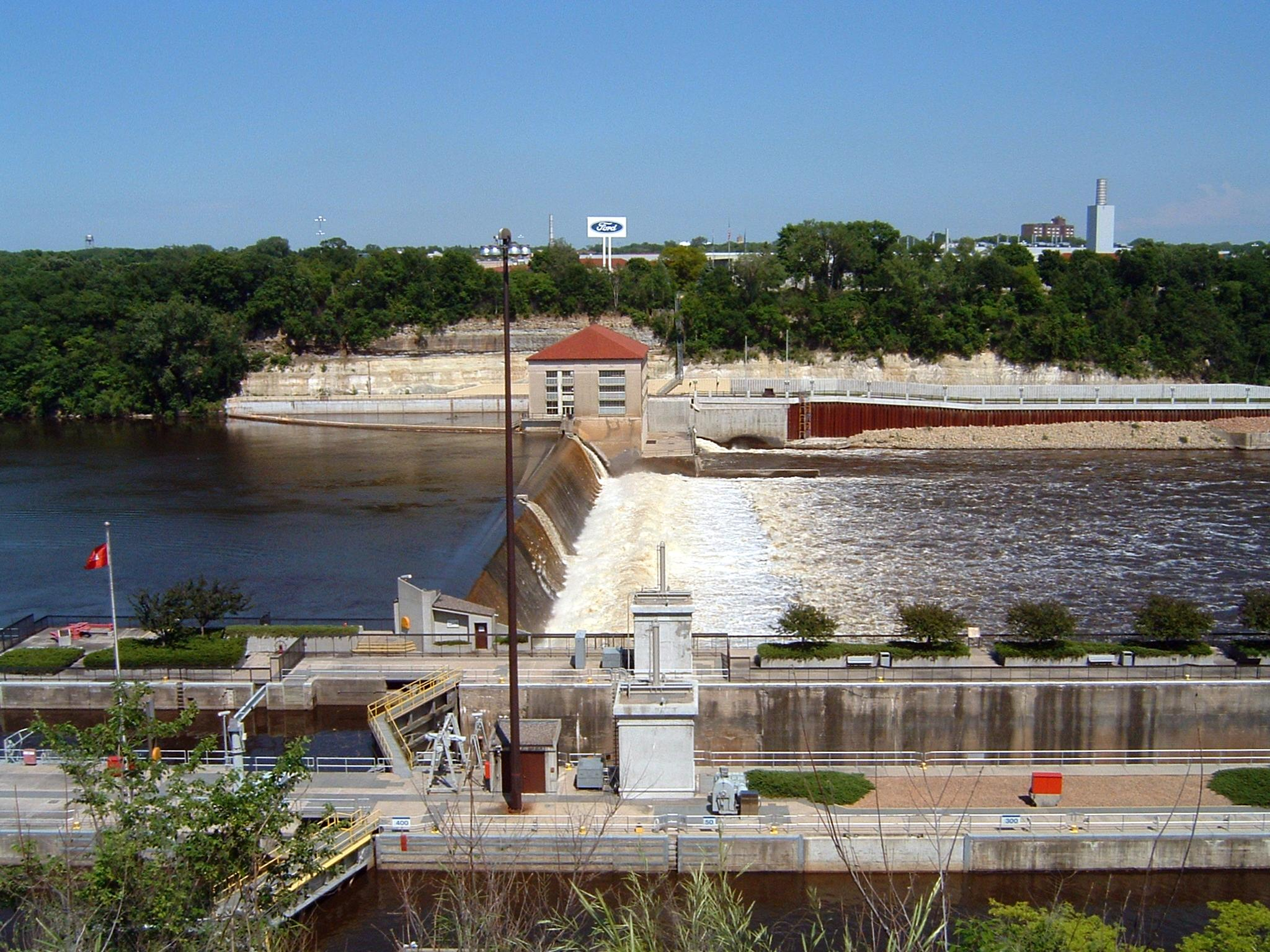
- Ford Lock and Dam

- Location within Minnesota
- Location: Minneapolis and Saint Paul, Minnesota, United States.
- Coordinates: 44°54′55″N 93°12′2″W
- Opening date: Locks completed in 1932; 94 years ago
- Operators: U.S. Army Corps of Engineers, St. Paul District

Dam and spillways
- Impounds: Upper Mississippi River
- Length: 574 feet (175.0 m)

Reservoir
- Creates: Pool 1
- Total capacity: 9,300 acre⋅ft (11,500,000 m^{3})
- Catchment area: 19,400 mi^{2} (50,000 km^{2})

Ford Dam, officially known as Lock and Dam No. 1, is on the Upper Mississippi River and is located between Minneapolis and Saint Paul, Minnesota just north of the confluence of the Mississippi with the Minnesota River at Mississippi River mile 847.9, in Minneapolis. The powerhouse portion was previously owned by the Ford Motor Company, which operated a hydroelectric power station to feed electricity to its Twin Cities Assembly Plant on the east side of the river. It was sold to Brookfield Power Co. in April 2008. The dual-lock facility and dam was built and is operated by the St. Paul district of the U.S. Army Corps of Engineers' Mississippi Valley Division.

lock and dam 1 tonnage

== Facility ==
The first facility at the site went into operation in 1917 and superseded the role of the earlier Lock and Dam No. 2 (today known as the Meeker Island Lock and Dam). The facility was rebuilt in 1929, and an expansion from one lock to two locks was completed in 1932. Each lock is 56 feet (17 m) wide by 400 feet (120 m) long (17 × 122 meters), half the width of the next lock downstream, though this is the only dual-lock facility in the district. The lift is about 36 feet (11 m). Major rehabilitation efforts were carried out between 1978 and 1983, including the replacement of many manual and hydraulic components with computer controls.

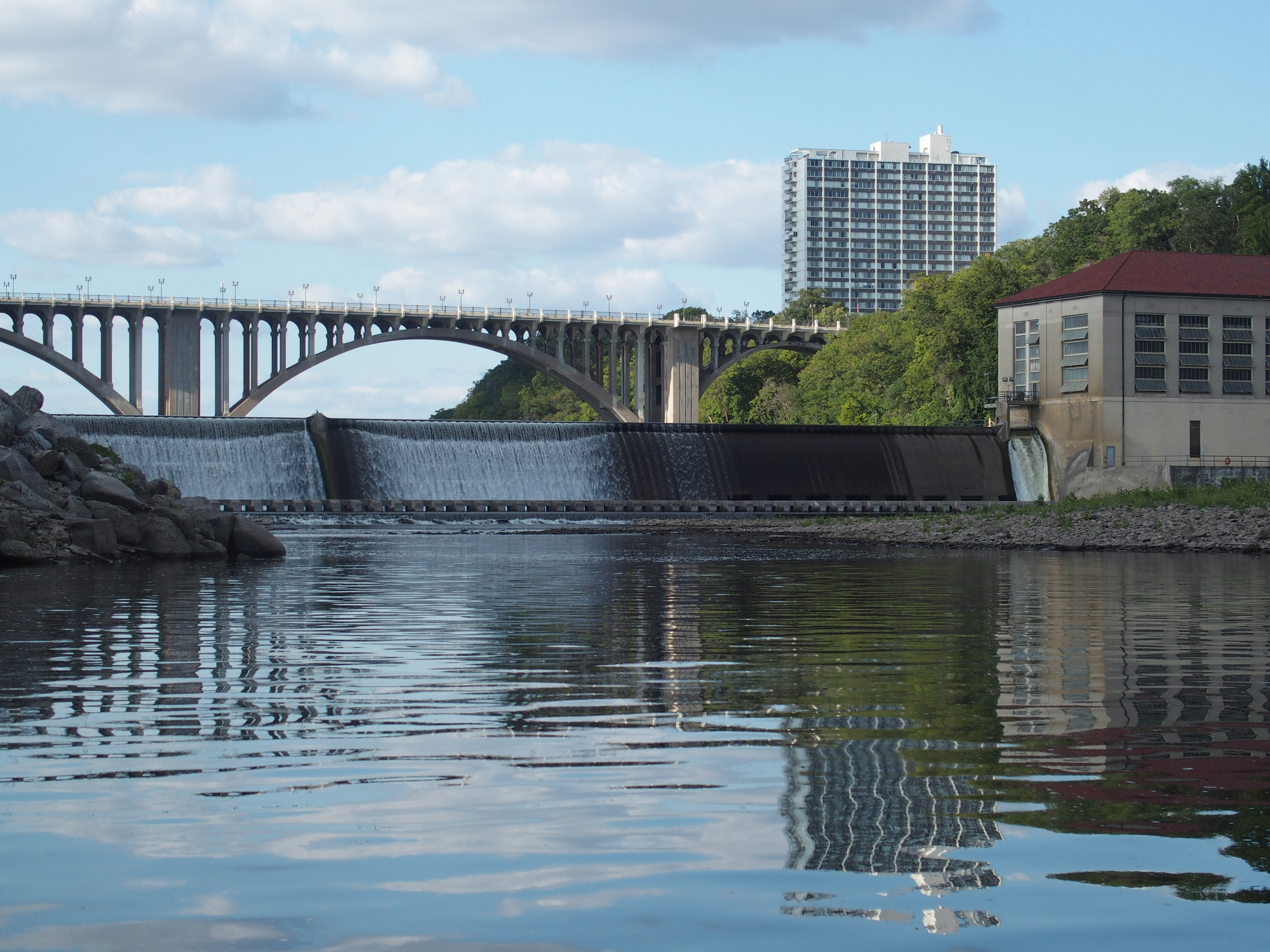
The dam as seen from downstream

The eastern portion of the site consists of an overflow Ambursen dam, which is a buttress dam where the upstream part is a relatively thin flat slab usually made of reinforced concrete. The lift is 36 feet (11 m). There is an inflatable flashboard system on top of the dam that can increase the lift by 2 feet (0.61 m) when so desired. The lock side of the facility has a large observation area that is open from April to November each year. A bridge allows visitors to walk over the two locks and right up next to the dam.

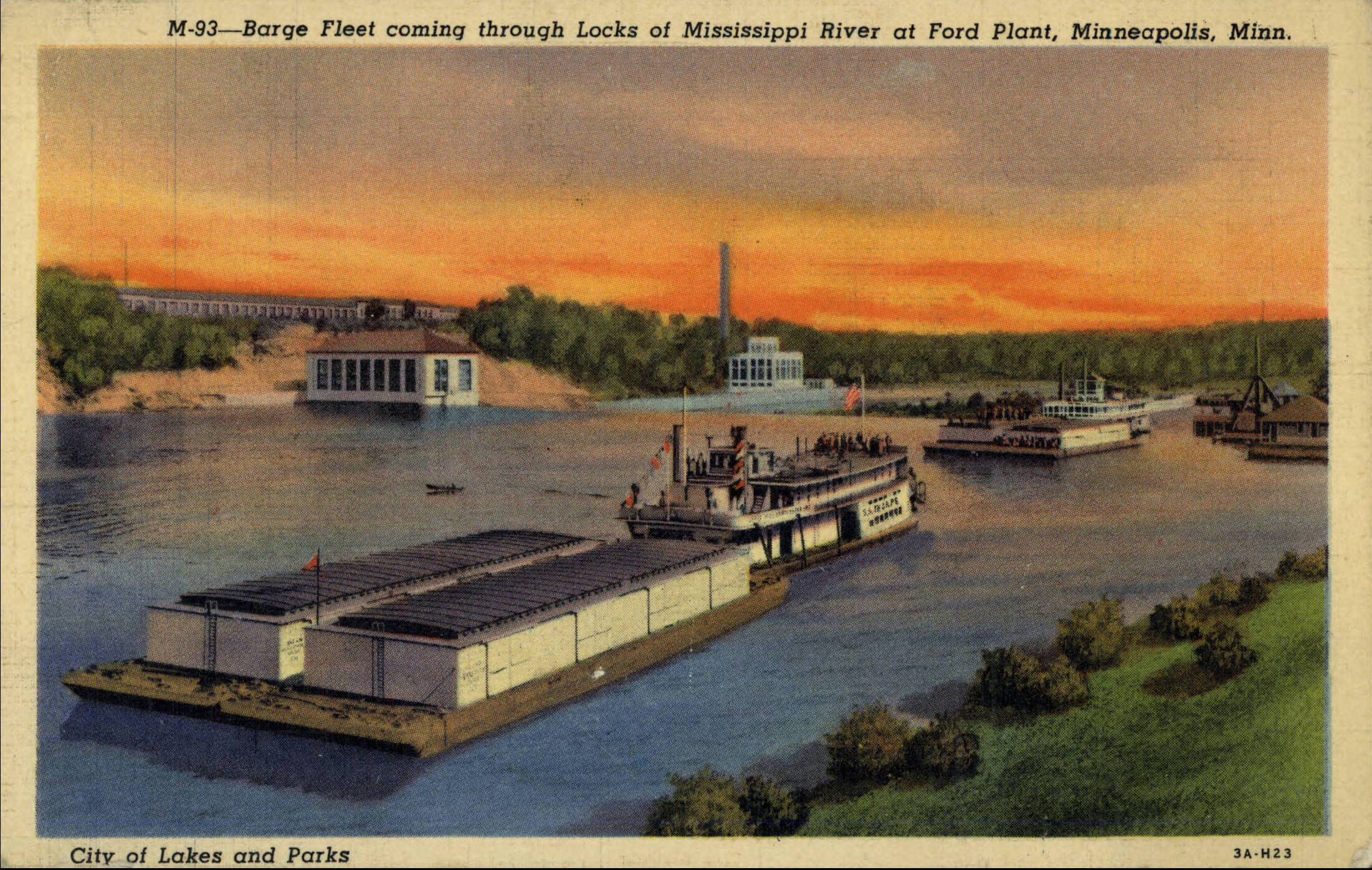
Barge fleet coming through the Ford Lock and Dam on the Mississippi River.

When the facility opened, it assured a navigable channel up to the tail end of Saint Anthony Falls upriver in Minneapolis. Additional locks were added there in the 1960s, extending the head of navigation to a dam in Coon Rapids (which has no lock), until the closure of the Upper Saint Anthony Falls lock in 2015.

Just upstream of the dam is the Ford Parkway Bridge.

=== Repair ===
In November 1958, extensive repairs to the dam began to correct serious leaking from one of the walls, which did not complete until the opening of river traffic in the spring of 1959. To prevent the underwashing of the entire structure, Ashbach Construction filled each wall crack and tunnel by Neoprin and concrete.

=== Hydroelectric Power Production ===
The Corps built a base for a hydroelectric plant in the 1917 dam but Federal law required that the plant not be built by the government. Ford built the powerhouse, completed 1924, to power an assembly plant Ford also built on top of the bluff adjacent to the plant. The assembly plant closed in 2011 and the land is being redeveloped for residential and commercial uses. The powerhouse is 156 feet (48 m) long by 112 feet (34 m) wide and is built into the east end of the dam. It includes 4 turbines and generators with a total capacity of 17,920 kW using 7,000 cfs of water. It generates about 97,100 megawatt-hours (MWh) a year. Before the closure of the assembly plant, the powerhouse supplied all the electricity to the assembly plant, plus free power to the lock and dam, and 22,000 MWh (22%) was sold to the local power grid. Since the closure of the assembly plant and subsequent purchase of the powerhouse by Brookfield Renewable Power Inc. in 2008 all electricity generated at the facility has been sold on the wholesale market.

=== Gallery ===
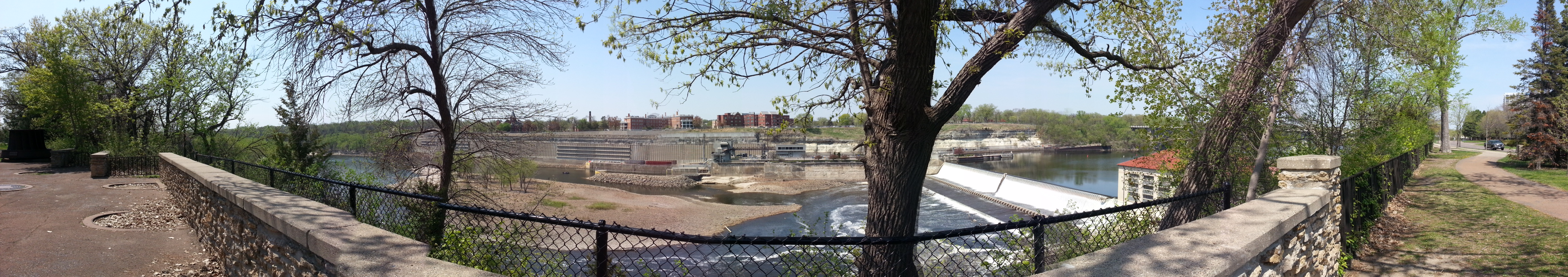
Ford Lock and Dam

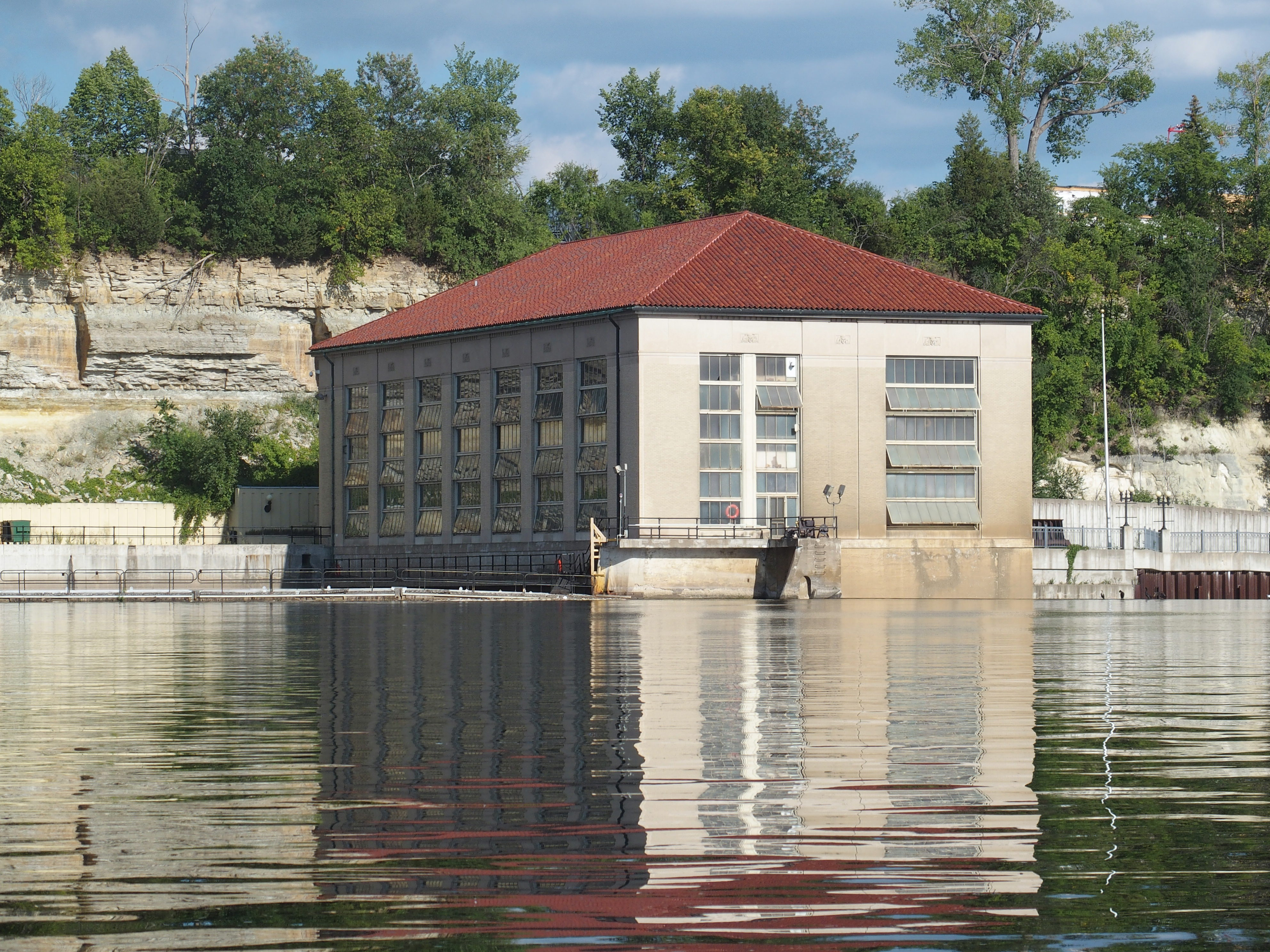
The powerhouse as seen from upstream

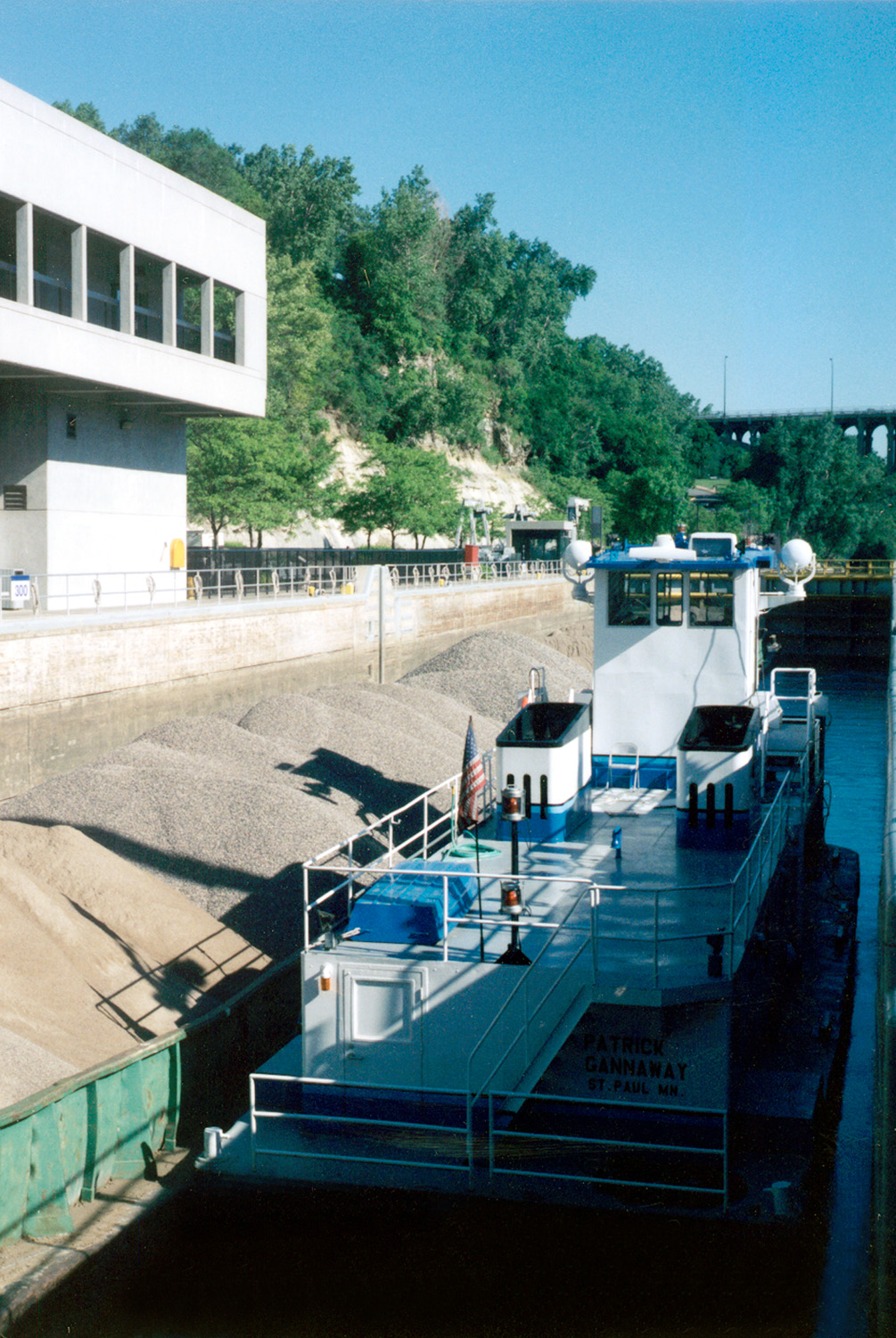
Towboat Patrick Gannaway taking a load of sand and gravel through Lock Number 1.

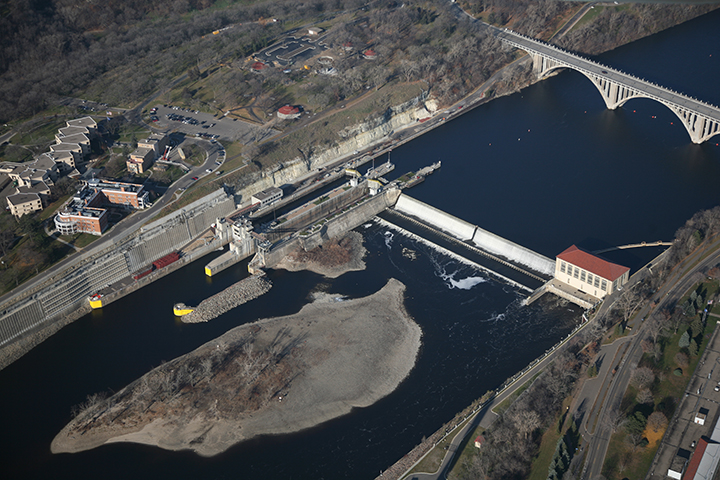
Lock and dam No. 1 with lock facilities on the left and hydroelectric powerhouse on the right.

1938 footage of the Mississippi River at the Ford Hydro Plant

== See also ==
- St. Anthony Falls
- Mississippi National River and Recreation Area
- List of locks and dams of the Upper Mississippi River
- Winchell Trail
