= Winchell Trail =

Hiking area in Minneapolis

Coordinates: 44°56′30″N 93°12′13″W

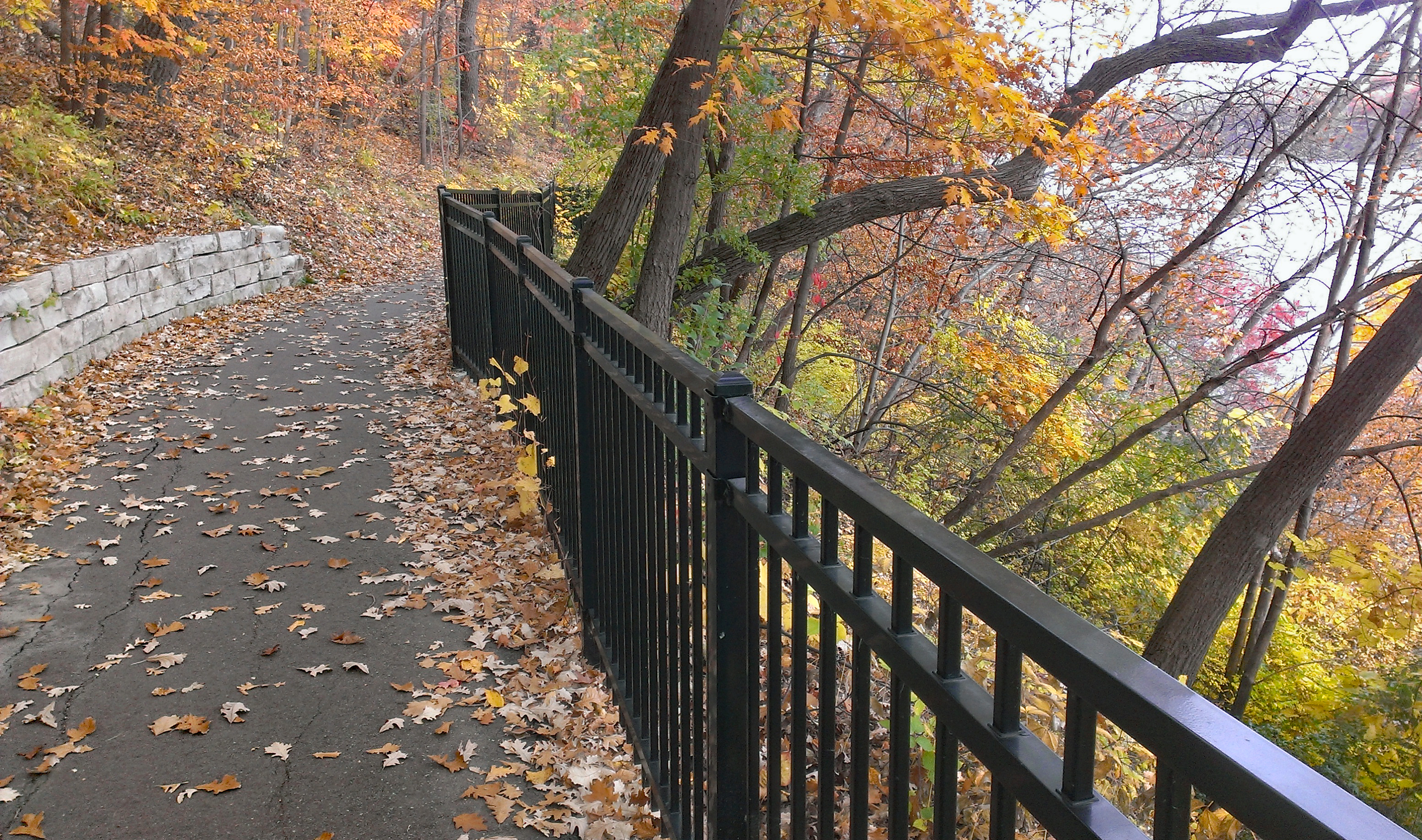
- The Winchell Trail overlooking the Mississippi River
- Length: 5 mi (8.0 km)
- Location: Minneapolis, Minnesota, United States
- Trailheads: Franklin Avenue South (north); East 44th Street (south)
- Use: Hiking only; Dogs must be on leash
- Elevation change: 501 feet (153 m)
- Difficulty: Moderate
- Season: Year round
- Sights: Floodplain forests; Oak savanna; Prairie grasses; River gorge; Sandy beaches; Springs and waterfalls; Wildflowers; Wildlife
- Hazards: Natural surface portions may be muddy after storms or snow melt

Winchell Trail is a five-mile round trip (8 km), pedestrian-only trail in Minneapolis, Minnesota, United States, that runs along the west side of the Mississippi River between East Franklin Avenue and East 44th Street. Popular with birdwatchers and naturalists, the rustic trail provides Upper Mississippi River gorge access and views. The trail is separate from the adjacent multi-use bicycle path, taking hikers past sandy beaches, an oak savanna restoration project, and the floodplain forest. The trail has multiple access points and the section from East 38th Street to East 44th Street is paved. Described as moderate and for all hiking skill levels, the out-and-back Winchell Trail has total elevation gain of 501 feet (153 m). Parts of it can be hiked in near solitude as its age and general dilapidation have made it widely forgotten.

== Route description ==
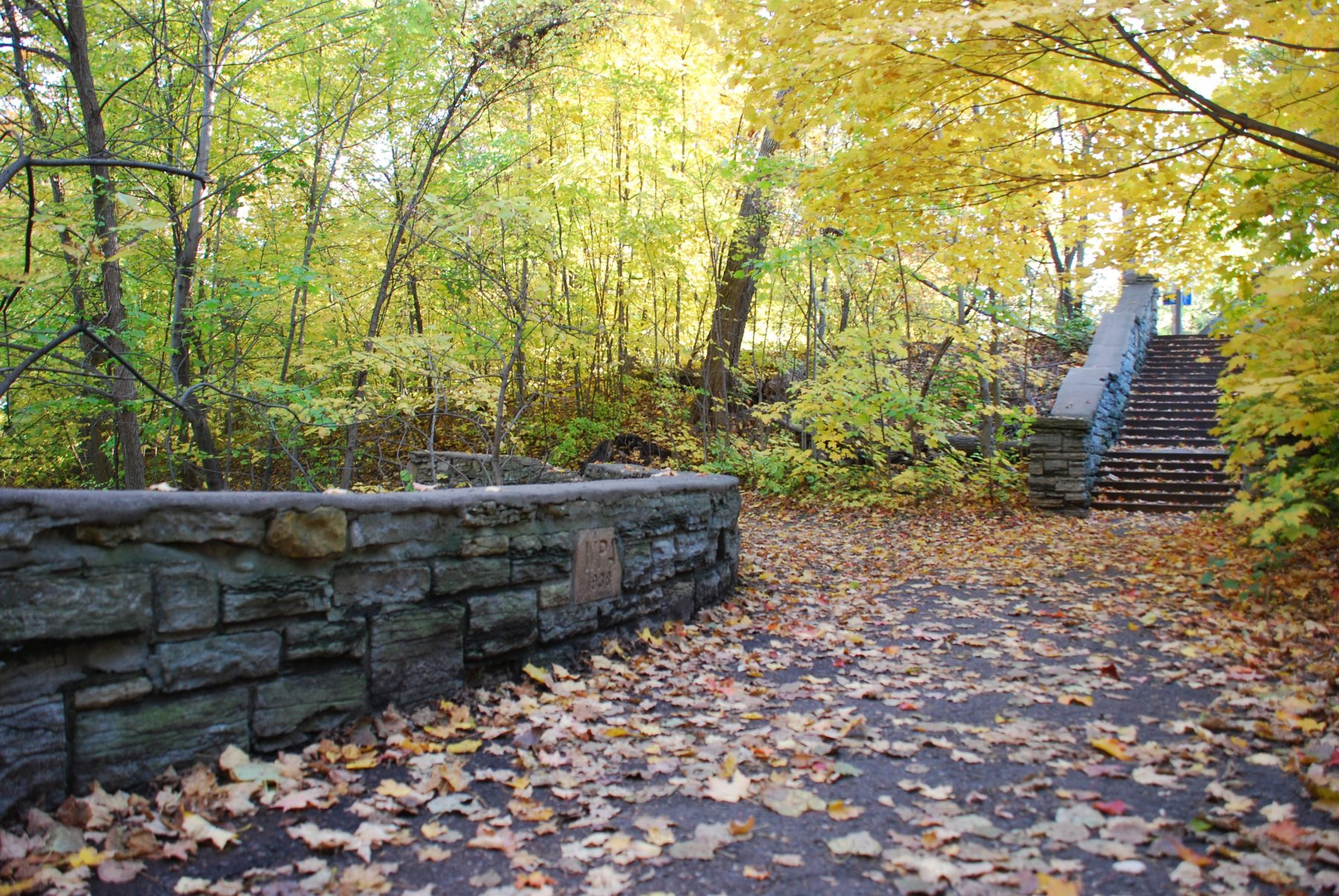
Winchell Trail entrance, October 2017

The Dakota people have lived along the shores of the Upper Mississippi River for many centuries. Winchell Trail may follow a path they created in the area. Residents and visitors who hike the trail experience what a native oak savanna looked like before European-American settlement.

=== Access points ===
Winchell Trail has multiple access points from the West River Parkway trail of the Grand Rounds National Scenic Byway. The northern trailhead is near Franklin Avenue South and West River Parkway. The southern trailhead is near East 44th Street and West River Parkway. There is also a signed entrance to the trail at East 36th Street with several paths down to the oak savanna site. There are a few crescent-shaped parking lots along the trail route, two near East 36th Street and one near East 44th Street. Many of the various access points have racks for bicycles, which are not permitted on the trail or other natural surface paths in the gorge.

=== Major points of interest ===
==== List from north to south ====
- Northern trailhead marker and Mesabi Iron Range boulder near Franklin Avenue South.
- Hajduk Spring near East 26th Street
- White Sands Beach near East 28th Street
- Minneapolis Rowing Club Boathouse near East Lake Street
- Longfellow Beach near East 33rd Street
- Overlook of the river gorge at East 36th Street
- Oak savanna restoration near East 36th Street
- Southern trailhead marker and overlook of the river gorge near East 44th Street

==== Mesabi Iron Range boulder ====
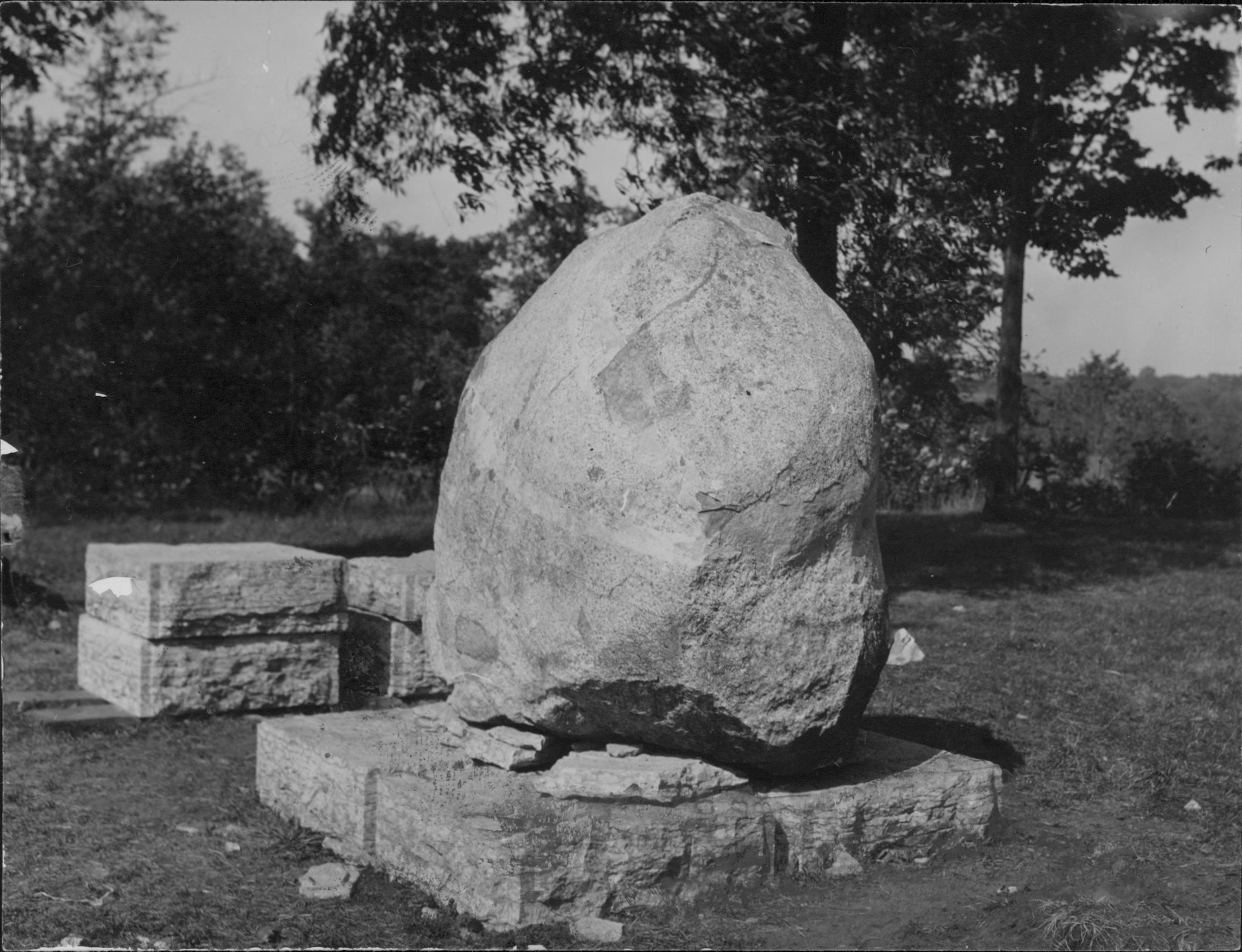
Boulder marking start of river bank path of Winchell Trail (1916)

The northern trailhead features a large boulder with a bronze tribute plague describing the scientific contributions of the trail's namesake, Newton Horace Winchell. Winchell's eldest son brought the boulder from the Mesabi Iron Range. The plaque on it reads:

The Winchell Trail marked by this boulder brought from the Mesabi Iron Range, was named in honor of the eminent geologist Newton Horace Winchell whose scientific studies along this river provided a measure for the time since the glacial period. His early appreciation of the economic importance of Minnesota's resources did much to preserve for the people some share in the state's mineral wealth.

==== Hajduk Spring ====
Hajduk Spring in Minneapolis is a falling water source from the limestone bluff above the Mississippi River near East 26th Street. Named in 1977 by the parks board after an area resident who promoted the spring, Harry Hajduk (pronounced "Hi-duck"), it was a popular drinking water source and featured access paths and a platform to fill jugs. The original path to the spring off the main Winchell Trail has fallen into ruin. Water quality experts do not consider the spring's water drinkable because of the use of herbicides and fertilizers on nearby residential lawns.

==== Oak savanna restoration ====
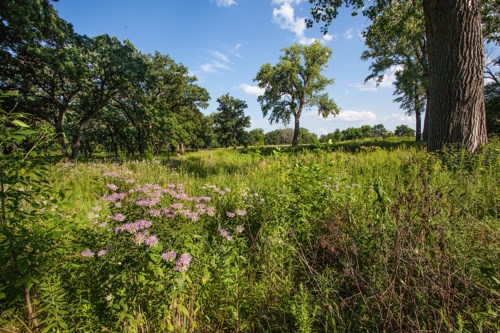
Native oak savanna landscape in Minneapolis, July 2017

The mesic oak savanna near the end of East 36th Street is a sensitive landscape. At this location, Winchell Trail splits off, taking hikers either down by the river or across the hilly restoration site with remnant prairie and oak savanna. The scattered oak trees are spread out enough that there is no closed canopy, giving way to prairie grasses, forbs, and clover lawn. The Minneapolis Park and Recreation Board is considering enhancements, including closing unsustainable trails, restoring the landscape, and replacing interpretive-educational signs.

=== Nearby sites ===
The hiking path's southern terminus connects seamlessly to the shared-use, bicycle trail at West River Parkway and East 44th Street. Hikers can continue southward to Lock and Dam No. 1, Minnehaha Falls Lower Glen Trail in Minnehaha Park, and Fort Snelling State Park via Minnehaha Trail.

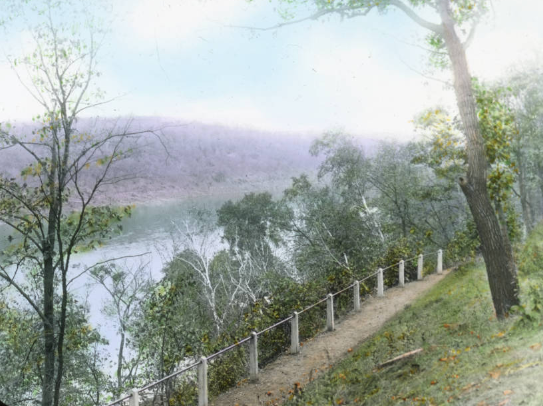
Winchell Trail in Minneapolis circa 1918

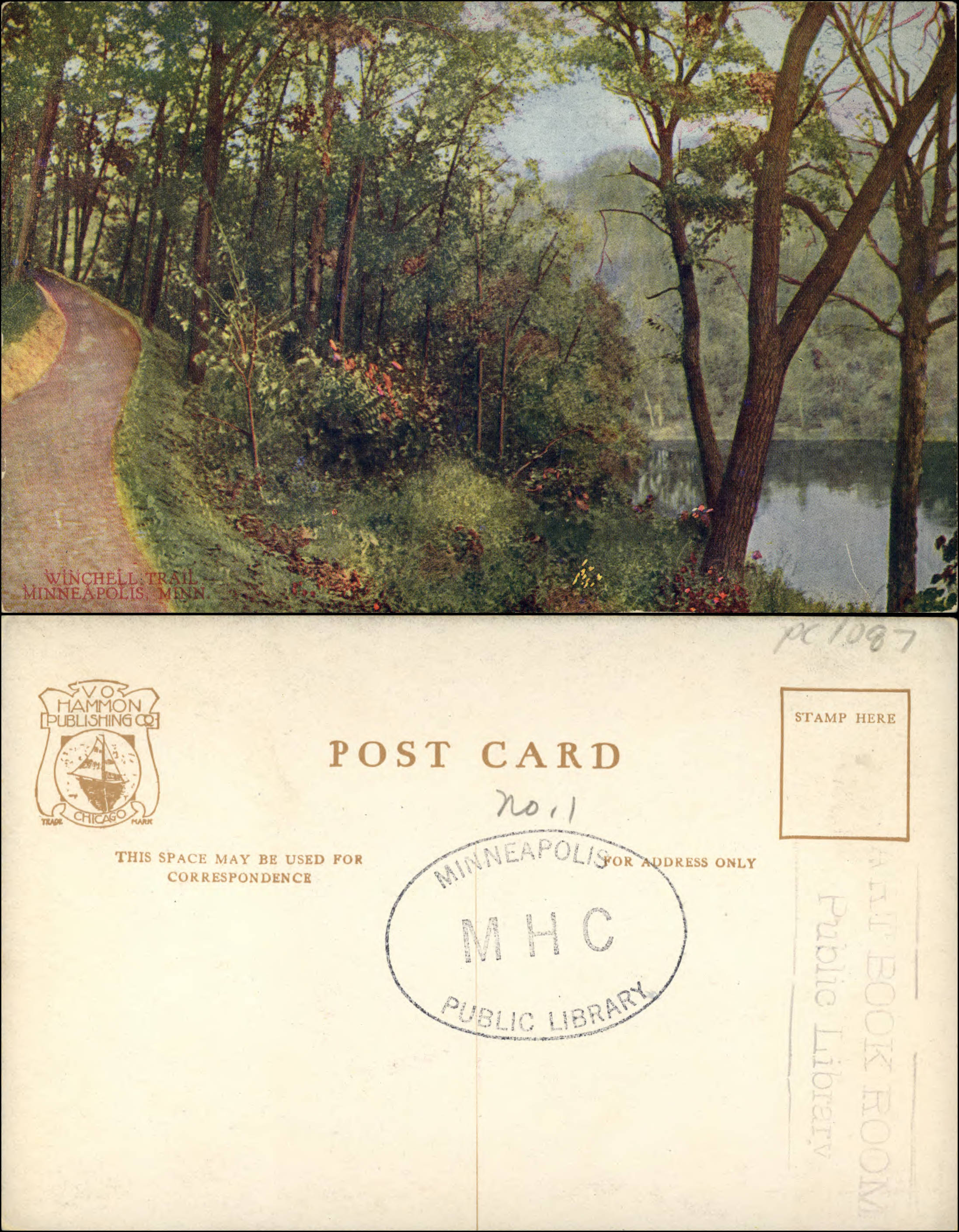
Winchell Trail, Minneapolis, Minn.

== Construction ==
Minneapolis Parks Superintendent Theodore Wirth commissioned Winchell Trail. It was constructed between 1912 and 1914, and improved by the Works Progress Administration between 1936 and 1938, when several stone walls and staircases were built. The trail is named after Newton Horace Winchell, a Minnesota state geologist who surveyed the Minneapolis area in the 1870s and published many works about measurement of the glacial age. The pathway was formally named "Winchell Trail" after his death in 1914. Winchell was not involved in its design or construction.

== Management ==
Jurisdiction of Winchell Trail is complex and overlapping. Running along the eastern edge of Minneapolis's greater Longfellow community, the trail is part of the Mississippi National River and Recreation Area and Mississippi Gorge Regional Park. The Minneapolis Park and Recreation Board is responsible for management and maintenance. In 1998, the Longfellow neighborhood council, park board, and National Park Service formed a partnership to restore the native prairie and oak savanna at East 36th Street. Since the early 2000s, there city has attempted to clear woodlands along the bluff of invasive plant species such as buckthorn.

=== Maintenance ===
As of 2019, the park board was considering several potential enhancements to Winchell Trail as part of long-term planning. The board may address inconsistent and worn railing and fencing, paved sections covered in soil and plant material, lack of natural surface trail alignment, and safety concerns. There are a number of undefined, non-designated natural surface paths besides the Winchell Trail in the area, but these were created by park users and are not considered sustainable.

== Recognition ==
In 2010, a local television station named Winchell Trail one of the Twin Cities' five best hiking trails, and in 2018 editors of a local magazine featured Winchell Trail in its review of Minnesota's best hikes and walks, putting it in the "Rigorous Hikes for the Adventurer" category.

== See also ==
- Dakota War of 1862
- List of shared-use paths in Minneapolis
