= Horace Vaughn Winchell =

American geologist (1865–1923)

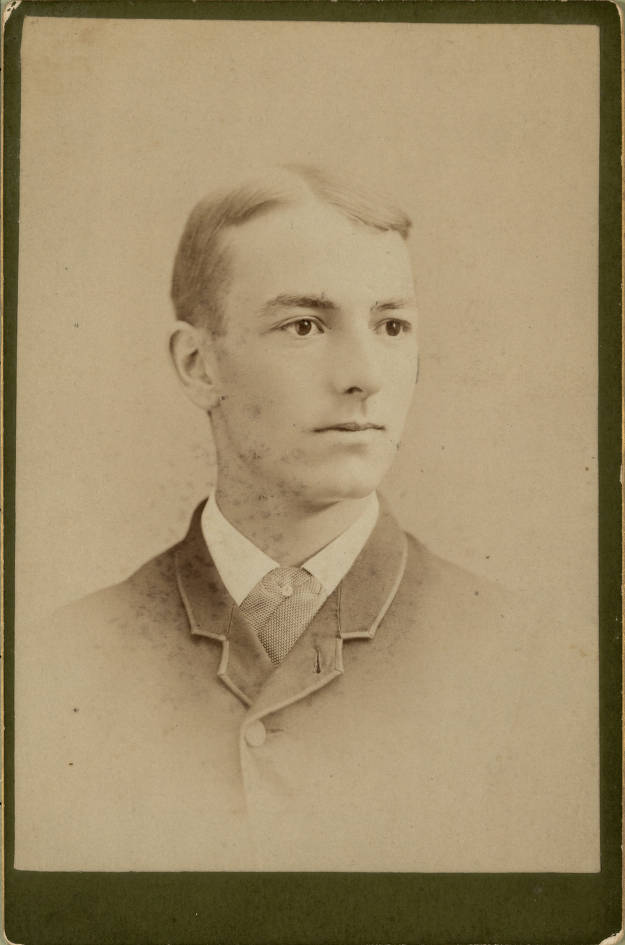
Winchell, c. 1880

Horace Vaughn Winchell (November 1, 1865 – July 28, 1923) was an American geologist who specialized in mining geology. Unlike his father, geologist Newton Horace Winchell, he worked mainly in the industry. He edited the journal Economic Geology which he also helped in establishing.

Winchell was born in Galesburg, Michigan, the first son of geologist Newton Horace and Charlotte Sophia. Educated at the Universities of Minnesota and Michigan, he followed his father and uncle Alexander Winchell's line of work and worked with the Minnesota State Geological Survey (1889–1891) and then with the Minnesota Mining Company. In 1893 he began a geological consulting partnership with Frederick Fraley Sharpless but they found little work due to the depression. He then joined the Anaconda Copper Mining Company in 1898 and in 1906 worked with the Northern Pacific Railroad. He then expanded his consulting work and travelled widely around the world on projects. Among his observations was that some iron-bearing strata were the result of secondary enrichment, possibly precipitated from oceanic water. These are now considered to be the result of early bacterial life.

Winchell married a cousin, Ida Belle and they had one child who died in infancy.

Ima Winchell Stacy was one of Horace's siblings.
