= Newton Horace Winchell =

American geologist (1839–1914)

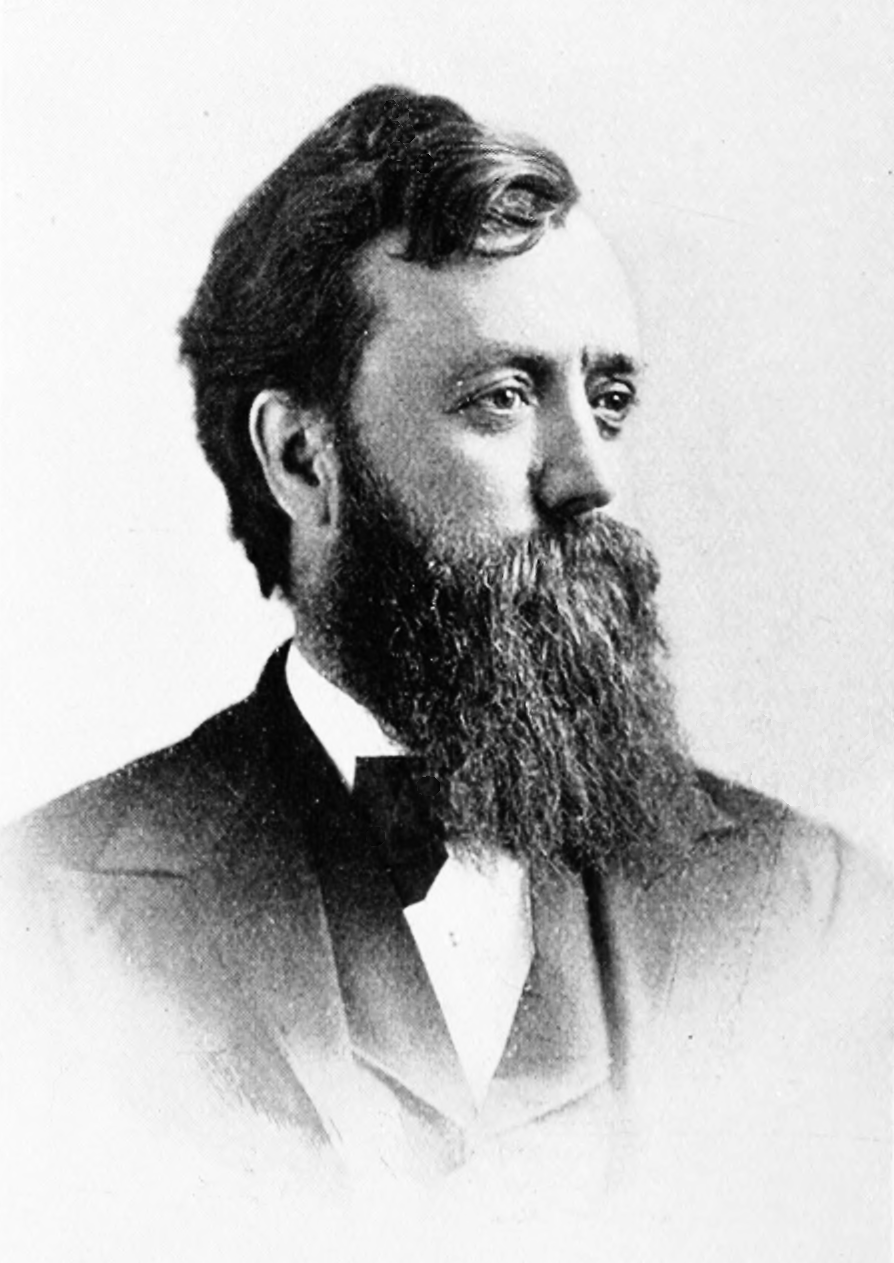
Newton Horace Winchell

Newton Horace Winchell (December 17, 1839 – May 2, 1914) was an American geologist chiefly notable for his six-volume work The Geology of Minnesota: Final Report of the Geological and Natural History Survey of Minnesota, which was prepared by Winchell and his assistants. A bibliography of his publications by Warren Upham in the Bulletin of the Geological Society of America (volume 26, pp. 27–46) contains almost 300 titles.

== Biography ==
Born in New York State, the younger brother of geologist Alexander Winchell, Newton Horace Winchell attended public school in Connecticut and then taught school in Connecticut and Michigan. While teaching in Michigan he graduated from the University of Michigan and received a Master of Arts degree in 1867. He then did geological studies in Michigan, Ohio, and New Mexico.

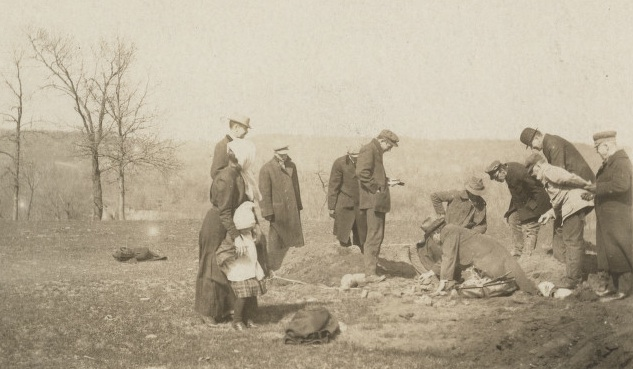
As a professor, excavating a Dakota site at Cambria Township in 1905

Winchell settled in Minnesota in 1872 when he was appointed to direct the Geological and Natural History Survey of Minnesota. At the same time, he taught courses in geology, botany, and zoology at the University of Minnesota. He had a reputation for "great diligence and honesty" (Merrill, 1964) and was considered "an honest, very competent geologist" (Thrapp, 1990).

Among the many investigations that Winchell published during the forty-five years of his active work as a scientist, author, and editor, the most widely influential was his study and estimates of the rate of recession of the St. Anthony Falls, cutting the Mississippi river gorge from Fort Snelling to the present site of the falls in Minneapolis. This investigation, first published in 1876, gave about 8,000 years as the time occupied by the gorge erosion, which is likewise the approximate measure of the time that has passed since the closing stage of the Ice Age or Glacial period, when the border of the waning ice-sheet was melted away on the area of Minnesota.

When he accompanied the Custer expedition to the Black Hills of South Dakota in 1874, Winchell prepared the first geological map of that area. He was also one of the founders of the Geological Society of America, a chief organizer of the Minnesota Academy of Sciences, and the president of several societies, including The Geological Society of America in 1902.

The Minnesota Historical Society, led by Winchell as Minnesota State Geologist, investigated the Kensington Runestone from 1909–1910. They were most interested in the physical aspects of the stone and the location of the find. Winchell made three trips to Kensington, examining the discovery site and the similar glacier-carried boulders in the area, and interviewing Olaf Öhman (the finder of the stone), his neighbors, and the townspeople. Winchell recorded his observations, sketch maps, and interviews in a pocket field notebook. He wrote in his notebook: "I had a long talk with Mr. Ohman, and am impressed with the evident candor and truthfulness of all his statements". Winchell's geological examination of the Kensington Runestone has been adduced to suggest that the stone is authentic, though most scholars now believe it is a forgery.

Winchell married Charlotte Sophia Imus and had six children: Horace Vaughn (who also became a geologist), Ima Caroline, Avis (Mrs. Ulysses Sherman Grant), Alexander Newton, and Louise.

Winchell had a bladder operation. Following the operation, he died on May 2, 1914, at his home on River Road in Minneapolis. He was buried in Lakewood Cemetery.

Winchell Trail in southeast Minneapolis is named after Winchell. The trail runs about 2.5 miles along the west bank of the Mississippi River from Franklin Avenue South to East 44th Street. Winchell Lake, located in the Boundary Waters Canoe Area Wilderness in Northeastern Minnesota was named for him.

== Sources ==
- Hanson, Barry J. (2002). Kensington Runestone, A Defense of Olof Ohman-The accused Forger. Morris Publishing. Out of print.
- Kehoe, Alice Beck (2004). The Kensington Runestone: Approaching a Research Question Holistically. Waveland Press. ISBN 1-57766-371-3.
- The Kensington Rune Stone: Compelling New Evidence at www.KensingtonRunestone.com
