= List of Minnesota placenames of Native American origin =

The following list includes settlements, geographic features, and political subdivisions of Minnesota whose names are derived from Native American languages or are popularly known by a Native-language name.

== Placename linguistic origins ==
The primary Native languages in Minnesota are Dakota and Ojibwe. Some Dakota and Ojibwe placenames are based on Iowa language, a people that had significant presence in the Southern portion of the state until the 16th century.

Many Minnesota placenames are translations or mistranslations, mispronunciations, or Romanized transcriptions of Native placenames and descriptions. Dakota, Ojibwe, and Iowa people had no written language at the time these names were popularly adopted.

One of the most common mispronunciations is that of the Dakota-language consonant "b", which is a combination of "m" and "b" consonants in English. In English there is no equivalent. Placenames were often recorded verbally and textually by European colonizers with the English consonant "m" in place of the Dakota consonant "b". In modern Dakota language, "b" is typically the correct consonant for words such as Bdóte, whose deprecated form in the historical record is mdóte. Cities such as Mendota, Minnesota take their name from Bdóte with the European colonizer mispronunciation of the Dakota "b" consonant.

== State name ==
- Minnesota – from the Dakota name for their homeland Mnisóta Makhóčhe: Where the Water Reflects the Sky.

== Native names by county ==
- Anoka County – named for the city of Anoka
  - City of Anoka – Dakota for "the other side" or "both sides" for the city being on both sides of Rum River. Possibly also from Ojibwe anoki meaning "I work", referring to local logging sites.
- Big Stone County – English translation of the Dakota name for Big Stone Lake mde inyan tankinyanyan: "very big stone"
- Blue Earth County – English translation of the Sisseton Dakota name for the Blue Earth River Makato Osa Watapa: "the river where blue earth is gathered"
  - City of Blue Earth
- Chippewa County – named for the Chippewa River, which takes its name from the Chippewa people, known in modern times as Ojibwe
- Chisago County – named for Chisago Lake, from Ojibwe kichi "large" and saga "beautiful"
- Clearwater County – named for the Clearwater River. Clearwater is an English translation of the Ojibwe name for the river Gawakomitigweia: "clearwater".
- Cottonwood County – named for the Cottonwood River, which takes its name from an English translation of the Dakota name wagacha: "cottonwood"
- Crow Wing County – named for the Crow Wing River, which takes its name from an English translation of the Ojibwe name Gagagiwigwuni: "Raven Feather River"
- Dakota County – named for the Dakota people
- Isanti County – named for the Santee Dakota
  - Shared with the city of Isanti
- Kanabec County – from Ojibwe ginibeg "snake", for the nearby Snake River
- Kandiyohi County – from Dakota kandi "buffalo fish" and ohi "arrive in": "where the buffalo fish come"
  - Shared with the city of Kandiyohi
- Koochiching County – from Cree or Ojibwe Gojijiing: "At the inlet"
- Lac qui Parle County – named for Lac qui Parle Lake, which takes its name from the French translation for the Dakota name Mde Iyedan: "lake that speaks"
- Mahnomen County – from Ojibwe manoomin: wild rice
  - Shared with the city of Mahnomen
- Otter Tail County – named for Otter Tail Lake and Otter Tail River, which take their names from an English translation of the Ojibwe name Nigigwanowe: "Otter Tail"
- Red Lake County – named for the Red Lake River, which takes its name from the English translation of the Ojibwe name referring to red sunsets reflecting off the lake
- Redwood County – named for the Redwood River, which takes its name from the Dakota name for the river Chandhayapi: red wood
- Rock County – named for a prominent outcropping of rock noted by the Dakota and named Inyan Reakah: River of the Rock
- Traverse County – named for Lake Traverse, originally called Lac Travers in French, a translation of the Dakota name for the lake Mdehdakinyan: "lake lying crosswise"
- Wabasha County – for the city of Wabasha, which takes its name from a line of Dakota leaders (probably specifically Wapasha II)
  - Shared with the city of Wabasha
- Wadena County – from Ojibwe for "little round hill"
  - Shared with the city of Wadena
- Waseca County – from Dakota washecha: rich or fertile (as of soil)
  - Shared with the city of Waseca
- Watonwan County – from Dakota watanwan: "where fish bait abounds"
- Winona County – for Dakota Chief Wapasha III's cousin Winona
  - Shared with the city of Winona
- Yellow Medicine County – English translation of the Dakota name for the Yellow Medicine River Pezhihutazi: "yellow medicine" or "yellow plant root"

== Native names by municipality ==
- Ah-gwah-ching – from Ojibwe agwajiing: outdoors
- Bejou – from Ojibwe bizhiw: bobcat or lynx
- Bemidji – from Ojibwe Bemijigamaag: "Traversing lake"
  - Lake Bemidji
- Bena – from Ojibwe bine: grouse or partridge
- Chanhassen – Dakota for "sugar maple"
- Chaska – named for the founding business Shaska Company, which takes its name from the given name for a first born son in Dakota Chaska
- Chengwatana – from Ojibwe Zhingwaadena: "Pine-town"
- Chokio – from Dakota or Sioux word for "the middle"
- Cohasset – named after Cohasset, Massachusetts, from the Massachusett word "Conahasset," possibly meaning "long rocky place" or "fishing promontory."
- Cokato – named after a Siouan word meaning "amid"
- Endion – from Ojibwe Endaayaan: "where I live"
- Eyota – from the Dakota iyótaŋ, meaning "greatest" or "most"
- Hackensack
- Hanska
- Hokah
- Kabetogama – from Ojibwe Gaa-biitoogamaag: "Place of paralleling water-body"
- Kanaranzi
- Kasota
- Keewatin – from Ojibwe giiwedin: North
- Keewaydin, Minneapolis – from Ojibwe giiwedin: North
- Mahtomedi
- Mahtowa
- Mankato – named for the Blue Earth River, called Mahkato by the Dakota: "the river where blue earth is gathered"
- Menahga
- Mendota – mispronunciation of Dakota Bdóte, the confluence of the Minnesota River and Mississippi River, which is the Dakota religious center of the universe
  - Mendota Heights
- Minneapolis – from Dakota mníȟaȟa (lit. 'waterfall') and the Greek language suffix opolis (city)
- Minnehaha
  - Minnehaha Creek
  - Minnehaha Falls
- Minneiska
- Minneola
- Minnetonka
- Muskoda
- Nashwauk
- Nokomis – from Ojibwe nookomis: "my grandmother"
  - Nokomis East
- Nisswa
- Ogema Township – from Ojibwe ogimaa: chief or leader
  - City of Ogema
- Okabena
- Onamia
- Otsego
- Ottawa
- Owanka
- Owatonna
- Pequot Lakes
- Pokegama – from Ojibwe Bakegamaa: "Side Lake"
- Puposky
- Red Wing – for the village of Dakota chief Tatanka Mani (lit. 'Walking Buffalo'), known as Red Wing for the red-dyed swan wing carried as part of his standard
- Saco
- Saginaw
- Sebeka
- Shakopee – from Dakota Shák'pí: "Six"
- Squaw Lake
- Wabasso
- Waconia
- Wahkon
- Wakemup
- Wannaska
- Wasioja
- Waubun – from Ojibwe waaban: dawn or East
- Waukenabo
- Wawina
- Wayzata
- Wenonah
- Winona
- Yucatan

== Bodies of water ==
- Bde Maka Ska – Dakota for "Lake White Earth". The lake was dubbed "Lake Calhoun" by European colonizers. The original name is likely a Dakota translation of the placename given by the Iowa people who inhabited the area until the 16th century. Early settlers and maps call it "Lake Medoza" after another Dakota name for the lake: Bde Bedoza.
- Big Stone Lake
- Blue Earth River
- Chippewa River
- Chisago Lake
- Clearwater River
- Cottonwood River
- Coldwater Spring – translation of the Dakota name Mníowé Sní: lit. 'Spring Cold'
- Crow Wing River
- Lake Esquagama
- Esquagamah Lake – from Ojibwe "last lake"
- Inguadona Lake
- Lake Kabetogama
- Kawishiwi River
- Kitchi Lake
- Minnehaha Falls – from the Dakota name Mníȟaȟa: lit. 'Water Waterfall'. A common legend mistranslates Mníȟaȟa as "laughing waters" due to the similarity to the English onomatopoeia "haha" for laughter.
- Minnesota River – from the Dakota name Mnísota Wakpá: lit. 'Minnesota River'
- Mississippi River – mispronunciation of the Ojibwe name Misi-ziibi: lit. 'Great River'
- Nemadji River
- Lake Ogechie
- Ogishke Muncie Lake
- Otter Tail Lake
- Otter Tail River
- Pokegama Lake
- Red Lake River
- Redwood River
- Lake Saganaga
- Sauk River
- Snake River (Elk River), Minnesota
- Snake River (Isabella River tributary), Minnesota
- Snake River (Red River of the North tributary), Minnesota
- Snake River (St. Croix River tributary), Minnesota
- Lake Traverse
- Lac qui Parle
- Lake Shakopee – from Dakota Shák'pí: "Six"
- Lake Sisabagama
- Siseebakwet Lake
- Us-kab-wan-ka River
- Watab River
- Lake Winnibigoshish
- Yellow Medicine River

== Landforms ==
- Bdóte – lit. 'Clearwater Confluence', the Northern tip of Pike Island and the surrounding area, known to the Dakota as the center of the universe and start of all life
- Cayuga Range
- Kaposia Landing – location of the former Kapoṡia (Little Crow's Village)
- Mesabi Range

== See also ==
- Bdóte
- Dakota language
- Ojibwe language
- Siouan languages
- Category:Dakota toponyms
- List of place names in the United States of Native American origin
