= Indian removals in Minnesota =

Removal of native tribes from Minnesota

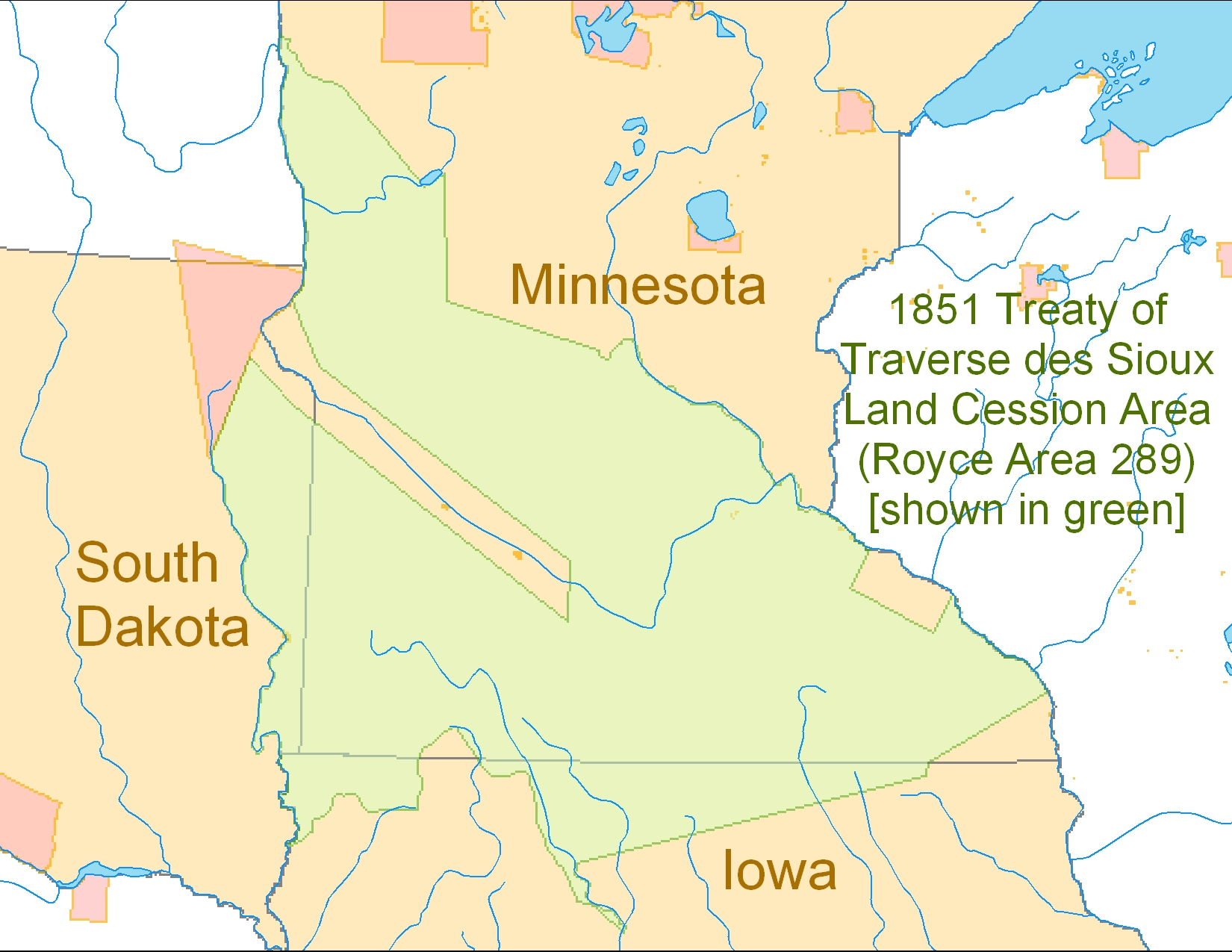
Map showing the boundaries of the 1851 Treaty of Traverse des Sioux land cession area

Indian removals in Minnesota followed a series of the land cession treaties made between 1805 and 1867 that led to the forced displacement and population transfer of the native tribes from Minnesota, most notably the Sioux (including the Dakota people, the Lakota people, and the Nakota), the Anishinaabe (specifically the Ojibwe), and the Ho-Chunk.

== Indigenous settlement ==
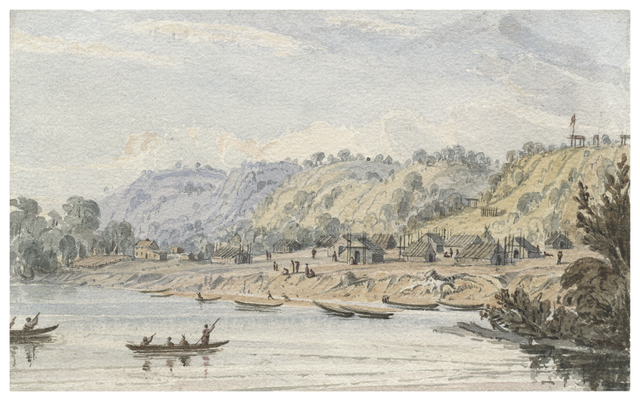
The village of Kaposia c. 1846

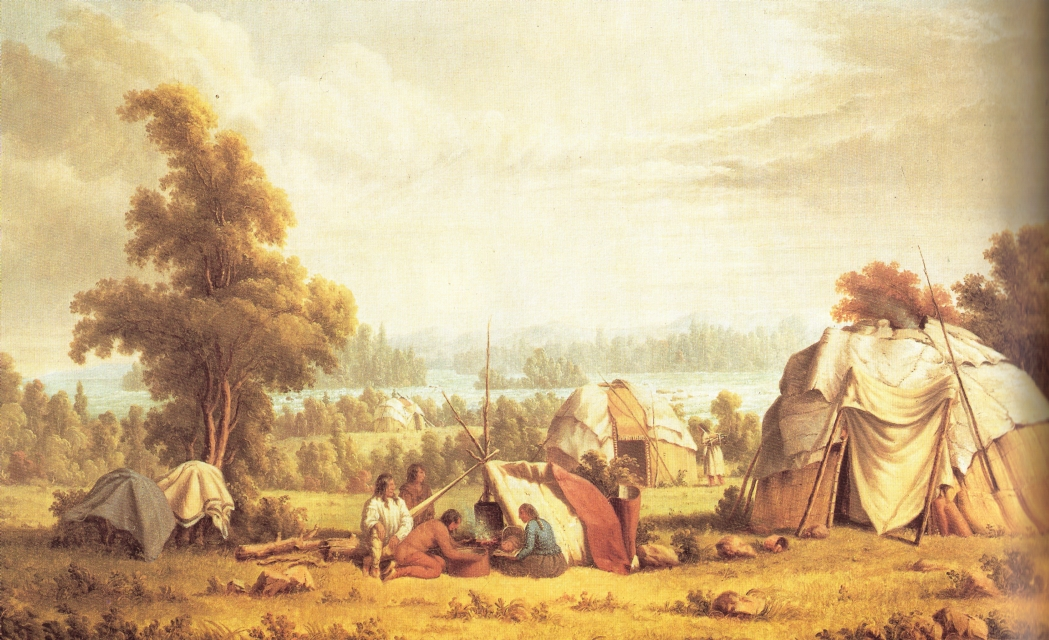
Ojibwa Village at Sault Ste. Marie in 1846 by Paul Kane c. 1846

The area of the modern-day state of Minnesota was first settled by various Indigenous people of North America, namely by groups of the Sioux (the Dakota, Lakota, and Nakota) in the southern and western regions, as well as the Anishinaabe, namely the Ojibwe in the northern and central regions around the Great Lakes region. Migratory villages such as Kaposia had existed in Minnesota since the 18th century and were led by the Kaposia band of Mdewakanton Dakota by a succession of chiefs known as Little Crow or "Petit Corbeau" which were first reported by the explorer Jonathan Carver in May of 1767. The Ojibwe historically are spread across much of upper North America including portions of both modern-day Canada and the United States. The Ojibwe, as well as the broader Anishinaabe are concentrated around the Great Lakes region to roughly the Great Plains and portions of the eastern Rocky Mountains.

== Treaties ==
=== Early treaties ===
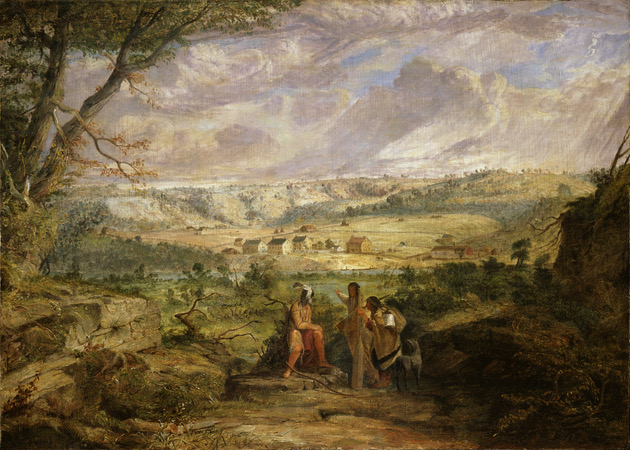
View of Mendota by Seth Eastman c. 1848

The first treaty to be signed with any indigenous group in the region of what is now Minnesota was the Treaty of St. Peters, also called Pike's Purchase, or the Treaty with the Sioux in 1805. When Meriwether Lewis and William Clark first travelled through the western regions of North America on the Lewis and Clark Expedition, regular reports of the expedition were sent to Spanish authorities by James Wilkinson. Wilkinson hired Zebulon Pike to form an expeditionary group and travel north on the Mississippi River in order to establish a fortification to promote trade and commerce in the region of what is now Minneapolis–Saint Paul. In September 23, 1805 Pike landed on what is now Pike Island on the confluence of the Mississippi River and Minnesota River and offered to sign a treaty and exchange money for land to several Dakota leaders at the island in order to create the fort, this fort would later become known as Fort Snelling. The 1805 treaty coerced the Dakota into signing the treaty through duplicitous means. Pike had originally agreed to pay $200,000 in his journal, the amount on the treaty however was blank. Years later, the United States Senate arbitrarily filled in the blank space with $2,000 to render the treaty "official".

=== Territorial treaties ===
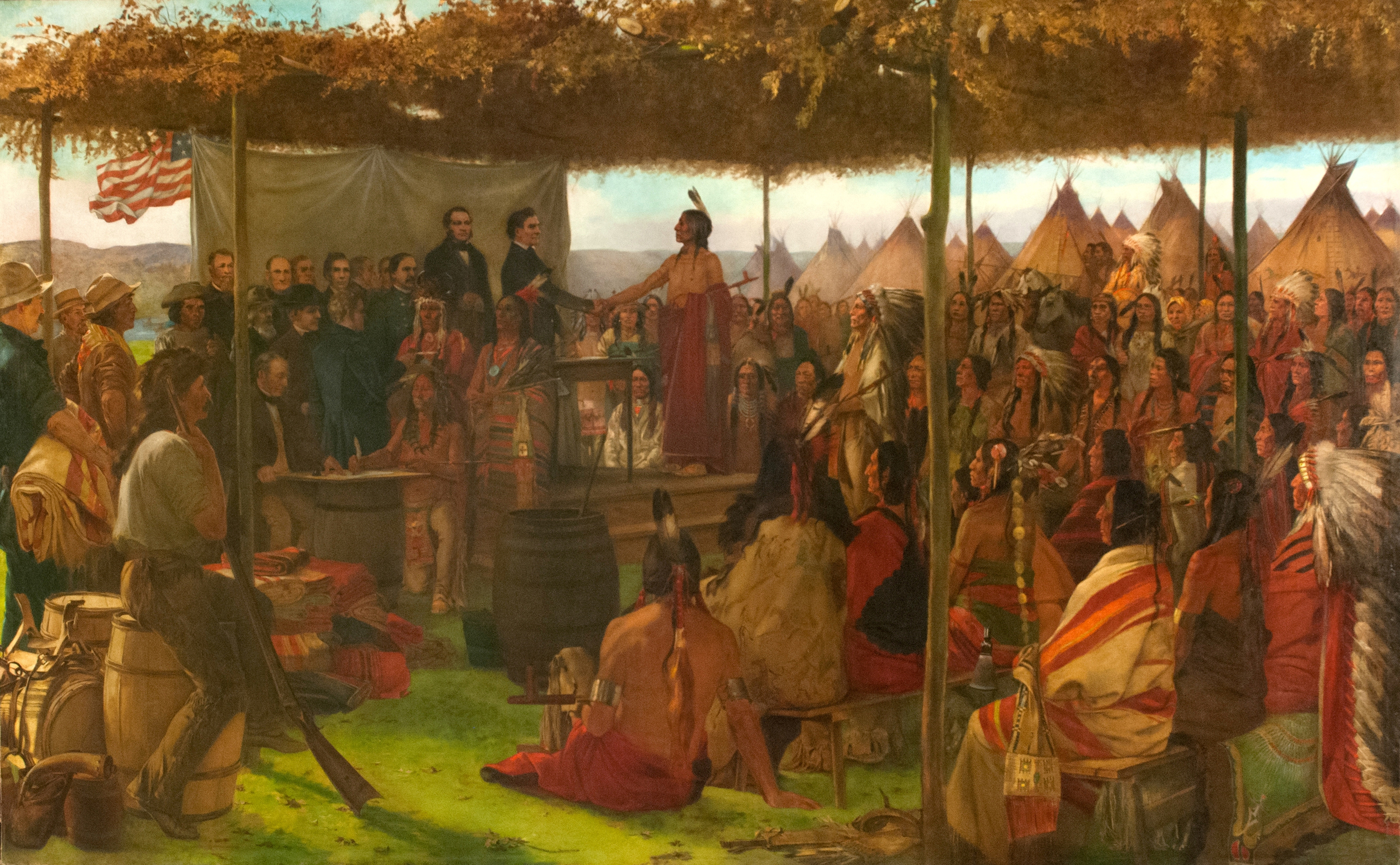
Treaty of Traverse des Sioux by Francis Davis Millet c. 1905

Years later in 1820 European-Americans returned to Minnesota to erect Fort Snelling under the leadership of Josiah Snelling which the fort would ultimately be named after. A variety of treaties were signed during the territorial era of Minnesota which lasted from 1803-1858, among them were; the Treaty of Mendota, the Treaty of Traverse des Sioux, and the Yankton Treaty. The Treaty of Mendota in 1851 primarily affected the Mdewakanton and Wahpekute Dakota of Minnesota, the treaty itself stipulated that the Mdewakanton and Wahpekute bands were to receive $1,410,000 (USD) in return for relocating to the Lower Sioux Agency on the Minnesota River and to give up rights to a significant portion of southern Minnesota. Meanwhile, the Treaty of Traverse des Sioux of 1851 ceded over 21 million acres of land in present-day Iowa, Minnesota and South Dakota to the United States Government for $1,665,000 (USD), by far one of the largest treaties to affect Indigenous land ownership in Minnesota. The Treaty of Traverse des Sioux would have lasting ramifications, including being one of the leading causes of the Dakota War of 1862. The Yankton Treaty was signed in 1858 and affected the Yankton Sioux Tribe. The Yankton Sioux ceded 11 and a half million acres of land for approximately $1.6 million in annuities, which were to be paid over the next 50 years. Famous signatories of the Yankton Treaty include Struck by the Ree, who saw opposition to the treaty as pointless.

=== Treaties after statehood ===
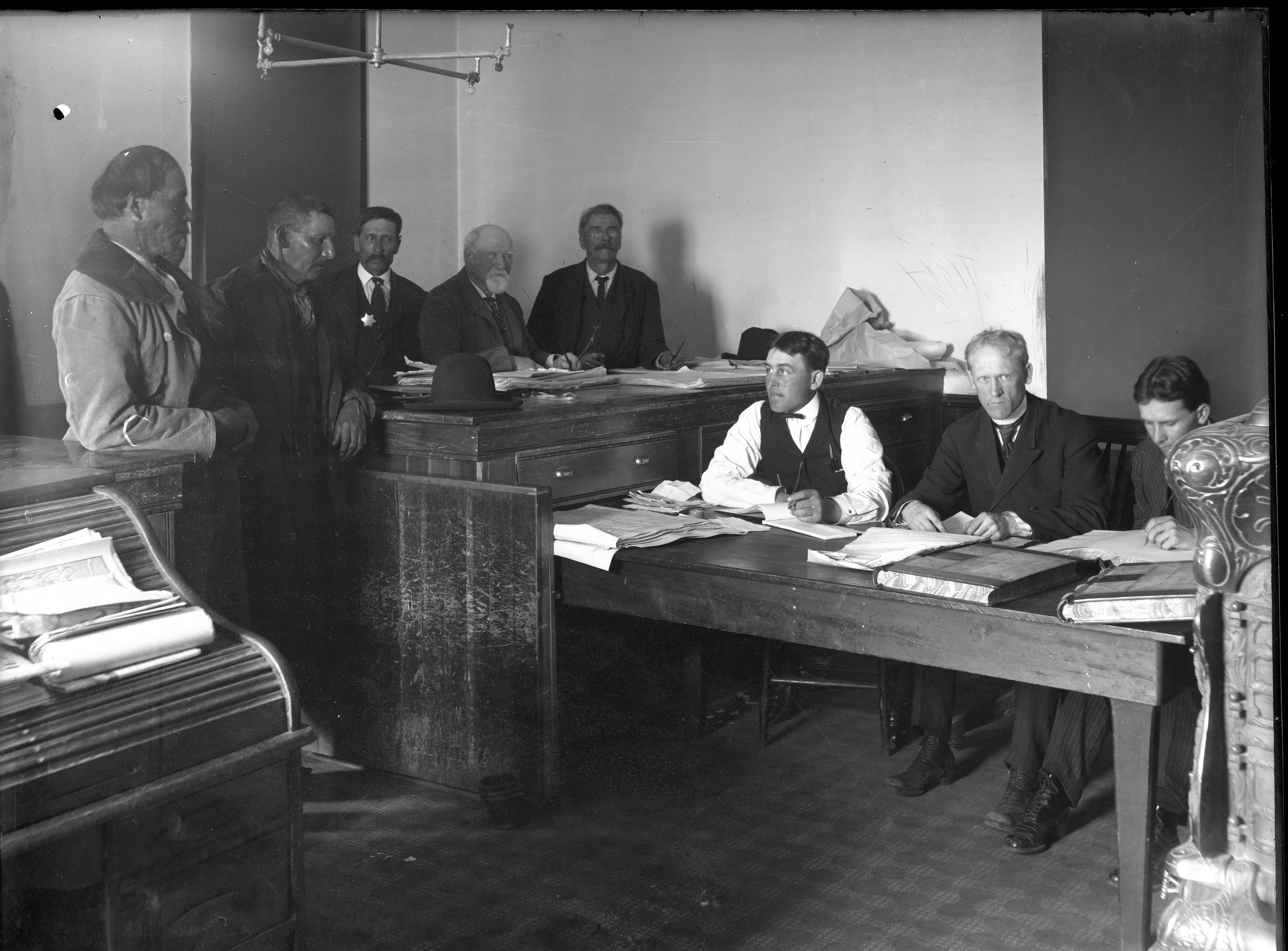
"Ojibwe Indians Awaiting Their Allotments at the White Earth Reservation".

Several treaties were ratified after Minnesota was admitted to the Union on May 11, 1858, the most notable being the Treaty with the Sioux, 1858 which was signed on June 19, 1858 and included various provisions such as defining the boundaries of the Lower Sioux Indian Reservation as that portion of the strip defined in the Treaty of Traverse des Sioux lying south of the Minnesota River. Notably, the treaty excluded the northern half of the land previously allotted to the Dakota. Additional provisions for surveying the land, allotting land to individual families, agency law enforcement, annuity payments, and economic development were also included in the treaty.

In 1859 another treaty was signed by the Ho-Chunk living in Minnesota at Long Prairie which would supersede all previous treaties with the Minnesota government, however, on February 21, 1863 a federal act was ratified which would permanently remove the Ho-Chunk from the state of Minnesota. The removal of the Ho-Chunk from Minnesota also due in part to the establishment of the secret society the Knights of the Forest, whose stated intent was removing all Indians from Minnesota.

The Ojibwe signed a series of treaties between 1863-1889 as well including several treaties in 1863 and 1864 which affected the Mississippi River Band of Chippewa Indians, the Pillager Band of Chippewa Indians, the Lake Winnibigoshish Band, and the Red Lake Band of Chippewa. In April, 1866 the Bois Forte Band of Chippewa signed a treaty ceding a large amount of land in northern Minnesota due to the discovery of gold deposits near Lake Vermilion. Lastly, in March, 1867 a treaty was signed by the Mississippi River Band of Chippewa Indians in order to relocate many of them to the White Earth Indian Reservation. The 1867 treaty was engineered to concentrate the Ojibwe population into a singular place, encourage the Ojibwe to farm through the allotment of land to individuals, and open valuable pine forests to logging. One of the last major actions which largely affected Indigenous people in Minnesota, specifically the Ojibwe, was the Nelson Act of 1889. The act itself intended to relocate all the Anishinaabe people in Minnesota to the White Earth Indian Reservation in the western part of the state, and expropriate the vacated reservations for sale to European settlers.

== Removals ==
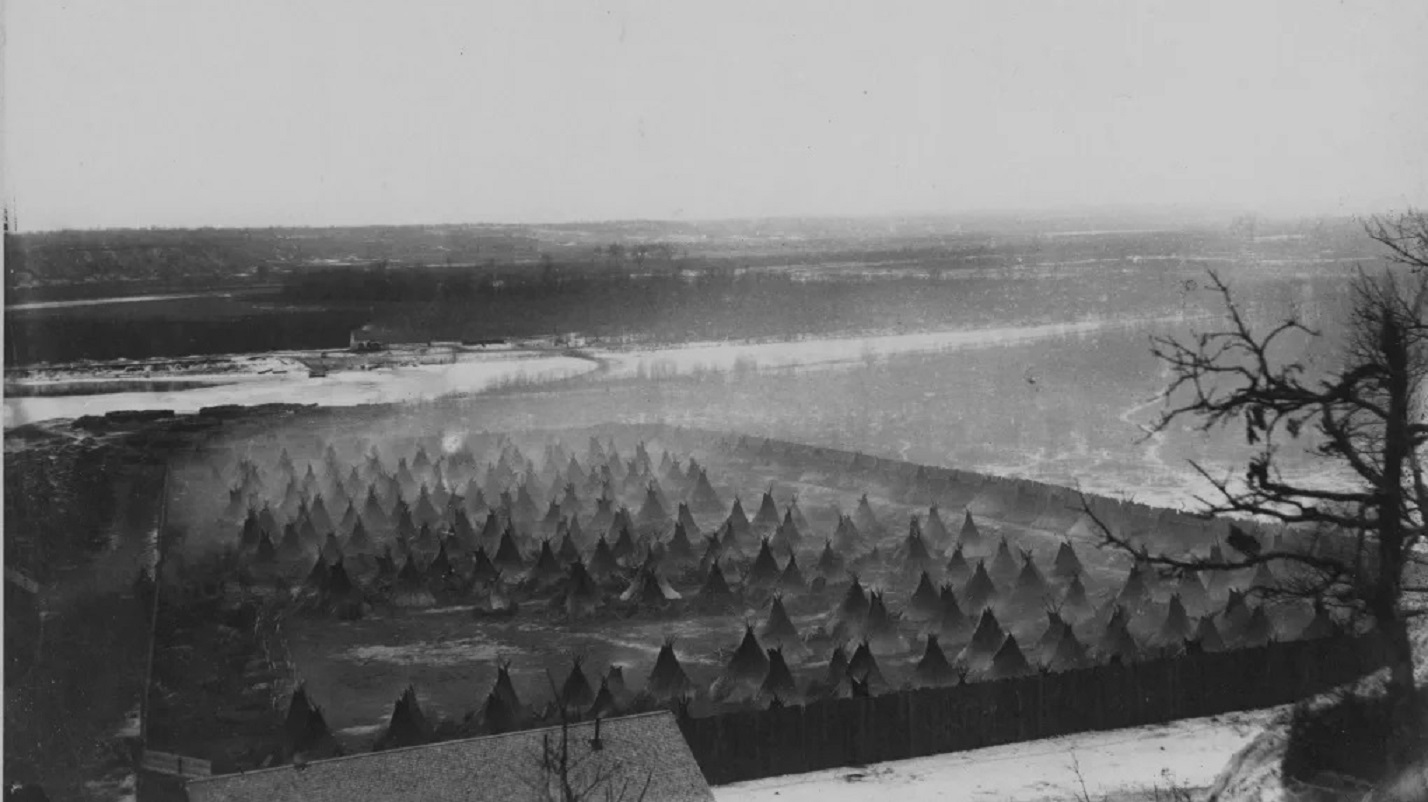
The Dakota internment camp at Pike Island on the Minnesota River below Fort Snelling

=== Sioux ===
The Sioux, primarily the Dakota and their subtribes, were largely removed from the state of Minnesota following the Dakota War of 1862 in Minnesota, as well as Sibley's Campaign, and Sully's Expedition in the Dakota Territory. Many Dakota living in Minnesota were held in an internment camp located on Pike Island and at the base of Fort Snelling in November, 1862 where conditions were abysmal and many died from disease. Many were later moved in 1863 to Camp McClellan in Iowa, a military prison later called Camp Kearney. The camp was decommissioned after the release of Dakota prisoners in 1866.

The Dakota were largely removed from Minnesota to the Dakota Territory, now part of the states of North Dakota and South Dakota where several major reservations were created. Other Dakota moved westward away from European settlers into the Black Hills, the Badlands, and west of the Yellowstone River. This area would later become a hotly contested region during the Sioux Wars which lasted from roughly 1854 to 1891 which ended with the Ghost Dance War and the Wounded Knee Massacre of the Miniconjou and the Hunkpapa Lakota.

The major reservations in North Dakota include; the Pine Ridge Indian Reservation, the Rosebud Indian Reservation, the Cheyenne River Indian Reservation, the Crow Creek Indian Reservation, the Lower Brule Indian Reservation, the Flandreau Indian Reservation, the Lake Traverse Indian Reservation, the Standing Rock Sioux Reservation, and Yankton Indian Reservation.

Several major Dakota communities still remain in Minnesota, primarily the; Shakopee Mdewakanton Sioux Community, the Prairie Island Indian Community, the Lower Sioux Indian Community, and the Upper Sioux Community. Other Dakota communities such as the Mendota Mdewakanton are not federally recognized by the US Bureau of Indian Affairs.

=== Ojibwe ===
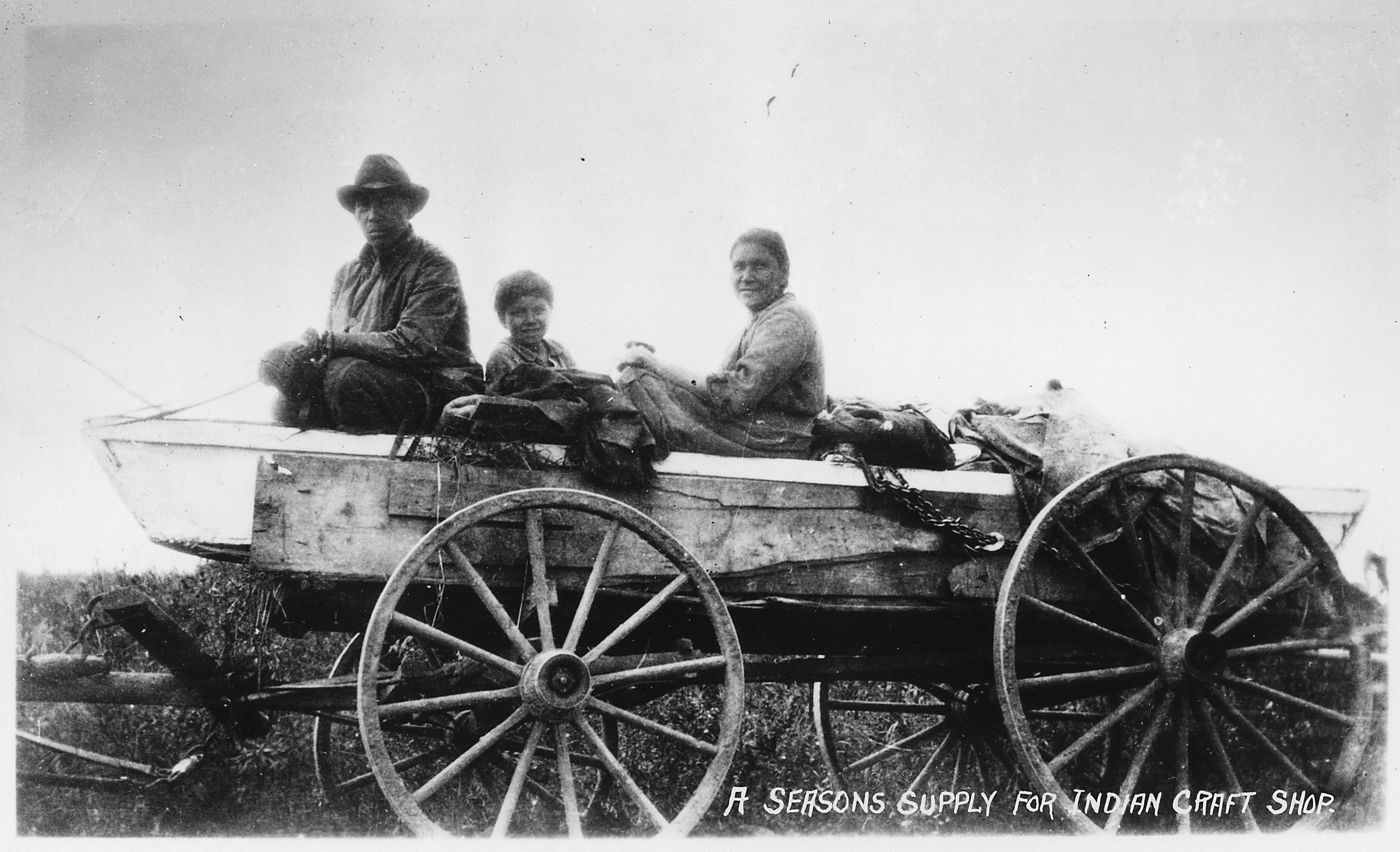
An Ojibwe family with goods in a wagon on the White Earth Indian Reservation c. 1934

While not formally removed from the state of Minnesota, the Ojibwe were still removed from certain lands they had possessed for several centuries in modern-day central and northern Minnesota, as well as Wisconsin and Michigan. In 1850 a removal order of the Ojibwe was signed by the President of the United States Zachary Taylor which led to the Sandy Lake Tragedy, where approximately 400 Ojibwe died due to harsh conditions and a lack of supplies while being forced to move to reservations in Minnesota. In 1842 and 1854, the Treaty of La Pointe established four major reservations for the Ojibwe in Minnesota, Wisconsin, and Michigan. In 1867 the Ojibwe renegotiated a treaty to relocate from central Minnesota to northern Minnesota at the White Earth Indian Reservation, although some resisted relocating. Lastly, the Nelson Act of 1889 largely affected many Ojibwe as the act intended to relocate all the remaining Ojibwe and other Anishinaabe people in Minnesota to the White Earth Reservation and expropriate the vacated reservations for sale to European settlers.

The Ojibwe currently have a total of 28 reservations in the United States and Canada; 7 of which are located in Minnesota. The seven Ojibwe reservations in Minnesota include; the Bois Forte Indian Reservation (also called the Nett Lake Reservation), the Fond du Lac Indian Reservation, the Grand Portage Indian Reservation, the Leech Lake Indian Reservation, the Mille Lacs Indian Reservation, the White Earth Indian Reservation, and the Red Lake Indian Reservation.

=== Ho-Chunk ===
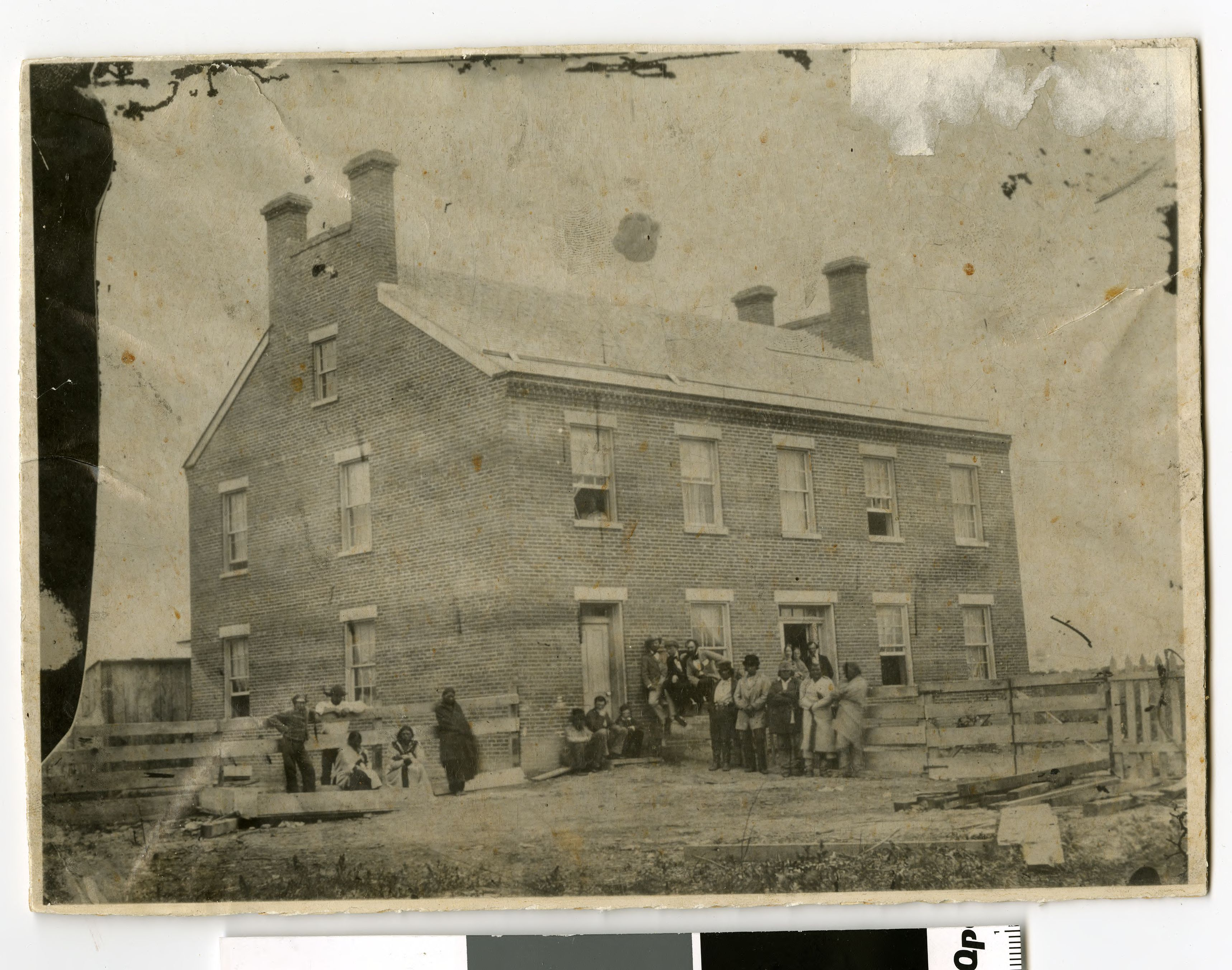
Exterior view of the Winnebago Agency House c. 1860

The Ho-Chunk (also called the Hoocąk, Hoocągra, or Winnebago) were removed from Wisconsin and had been in Minnesota, most notably in Long Prairie, Minnesota, since 1846. The Ho-Chunk had been involved with peace treaties with various governments as early as 1816. For example, the Ho-Chunk were signatories of the First Treaty of Prairie du Chien alongside the Ojibwe, the Illinois Confederation, the Santee Dakota, the Sauk, and the Meskwaki in 1825. Unlike the Ojibwe, none of the Ho-Chunk treaties reserved rights for them to hunt, fish, or gather crops on their ceded lands.

According to the Minnesota Historical Society the Ho-Chunk's homeland was originally in Wisconsin. Between 1832 and 1837 several treaties were signed between the Ho-Chunk and the United States government in order to place them on reservations in Iowa. The Ho-Chunk would later be removed from Iowa starting in the summer of 1848 to non-arable land in Long Prairie, Minnesota. One notable Indian agent who assisted the government of Minnesota in the removal of the Ho-Chunk was Edwin Aaron Clark Hatch. Hatch later commanded Hatch's Minnesota Cavalry Battalion in the aftermath of the Dakota War of 1862.

On August 6, 1853, 32 Ho-Chunk ceded their land in Long Prairie for 500,000 acres of land on the Crow River. The land was considered a better option for the Ho-Chunk than Long Prairie by Governor Willis A. Gorman. On February 7, 1855, the Ho-Chunk ceded a further 897,900 aces of their land near Long Prairie in exchange for 200,000 acres along the Blue Earth River in Minnesota. This new arable land was considered much better and allowed the Ho-Chunk to produce various crops for subsistence agriculture. In 1863 following the Dakota War of 1862 the Ho-Chunk would be permanently removed from Minnesota to the Crow Creek Indian Reservation in South Dakota. Due to abysmal conditions many Ho-Chunk were relocated to Nebraska where the Winnebago Tribe of Nebraska still remains today.

== After removal ==
The Indian removals in Minnesota still affect many Indigenous people today, most notably the Dakota people who still primarily live on reservations in the Dakotas, while their ancestral lands are historically in Minnesota. Various Dakota communities in Minnesota, including the Shakopee Mdewakanton Sioux Community, have made petitions to the Minnesota Government and Federal Government of the United States in order to have portions of their land returned to their respected tribes under the Land Back movement. More recently, the Shakopee Mdewakanton applied to put 815 acres of the southwest Minneapolis–Saint Paul metropolitan area into a trust, ensuring the tribe will own the land indefinitely. Other groups, such as the Mendota Mdewakanton Dakota Tribal Community have sought federal recognition by both the state and federal government.

== See also ==
- Indian removal
- History of Minnesota
