= Mona Smith (artist) =

Native American artist, storyteller and documentary producer

Mona Smith is a Native American artist, storyteller and documentary producer.

== Early life and education ==
Smith is a citizen of the Sisseton-Wahpeton Oyate, a Native American tribe with a reservation in northeastern South Dakota. Smith's mother left the reservation at 17 years old after receiving a scholarship to a Kentucky junior college. Subsequently, Smith was raised in Red Wing, Minnesota. She attended the Villa Maria Academy for Girls, a boarding school, before matriculating at Webster College in St. Louis, Missouri. She focused on women's studies as a graduate student at Minnesota State University, Mankato. While there, she attended her first videography workshop and became interested in film-making. She starting working with Nan Toskey, who became a mentor and collaborator on early work. After she decided to commit to film-making as a career, Smith supported herself for a time by creating commercial advertisements, documentaries and educational pieces.

== Career ==
Smith's created her first Native-focused short film in 1986, "Heartbeat Drumbeat", for the Minnesota Indian Women's Resource Center.

Smith directed several short films with topics at the intersection of Native culture and health, including Her Giveaway: A Spiritual Journey with AIDS (1988) and Honored by the Moon (1990). Her Giveaway is a 45-minute film that tells the story of Carole Lafavor, as she reflects on life as an HIV-positive Ojibwe woman. Smith believed the piece would have a small audience of a few local tribes, however it found a broader reach, largely "because Carole's story was one that people of all kinds could connect with." Honored by the Moon is a 15-minute documentary focusing on the place of gay and lesbian people within tribal communities, and intersperses contemporary coming-out stories with a historical perspectives.

From 2004 to 2005, Smith's project "Cloudy Waters: Dakota Reflections on the River" was featured at the Minnesota History Center. The multimedia artwork portrayed the Mississippi River from the perspective of the Dakota people, and used water, ambient sound, video and still images to provide the experience. The audio component of "Cloudy Waters" is permanently installed in the courtyard at the Mill City Museum in Minneapolis, Minnesota; the installation has been mounted at the Experiential Gallery of Virginia Tech (2010), in Galway, Ireland and at the Goodhue County Historical Society and the Science Museum of Minnesota.

In 2006, Smith's "City Indians" exhibit explored the place of the Dakota people in the Twin Cities of Minnesota. Smith noted that the city of Minneapolis and specifically the juncture of the Minnesota and Mississippi rivers "is where the Dakota people began."

Smith submitted a self-portrait "Between" to the Ancient Traders Gallery exhibition, "Hokah!" featuring portraits from 27 Native American artists. Smith's piece was described as showing "a sadly distorted Indian face pressed between two rocks and the date 2012, the 150th anniversary of the Dakota wars that signaled the end of her people's autonomy."

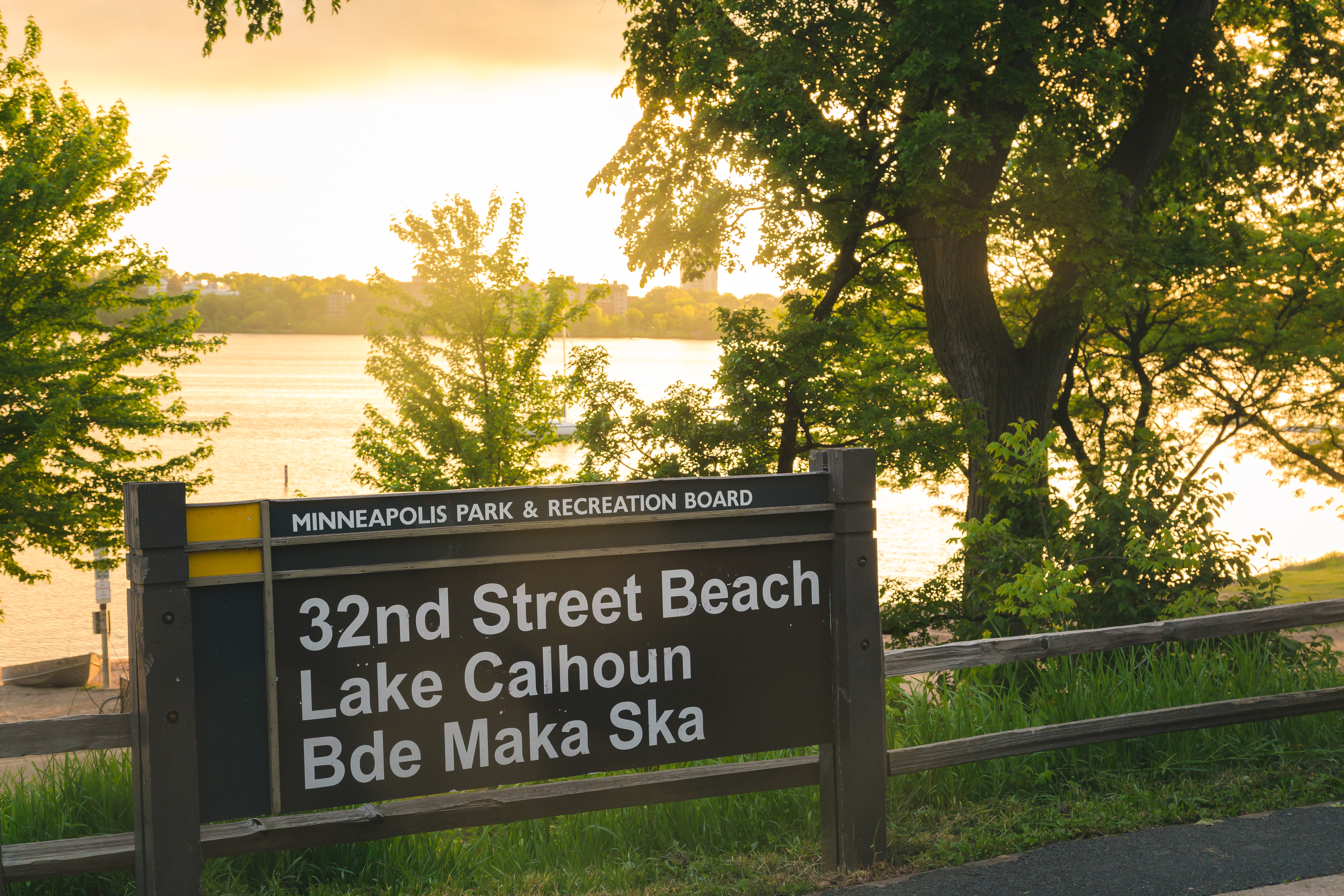
The shores of Bde Maka Ska (renamed from Lake Calhoun in 2020) in Minneapolis, Minnesota. Smith was selected to create a public art installation at the lake, honoring the history of Native settlement along the lake shore.

In 2012, Smith created the Bdote Memory Map, an interactive online map of Bdóte, an area of sacred significance to the Dakota people, centered around the confluence of the Minnesota and Mississippi rivers. The project was produced in partnership with the Minnesota Humanities Center, and featured Minnesota sites including Fort Snelling, Coldwater Spring and Pike Island. Smith combined stories, video and images of the areas to create an informational map relating to the sites.

Smith co-founded the Healing Place Collaborative, an association of forty activists, environmentalists and policy-makers and artists with an interest in the Mississippi River. The group aims to help individuals working on issues related to history and language, environmental justice and water to find common purpose, particularly in understand and healing the relationship between Native people of Minnesota and the lands around Bdóte. Smith asks "What would our work look like if we put the Indigenous perspective first?"

In 2018, Smith, along with artists Sandy Spieler and Angela Two Stars, was asked to create a public art installation on the shores of Bde Maka Ska (formerly Lake Calhoun) in Minneapolis, Minnesota to mark the restoration of its Dakota name. The project's theme is "Story Awakening" and honors the history of Dakota people who lived by the shore of the lake before being displaced. According to Spieler, the project recognizes a Native community Ḣeyata Ọtuŋwe, translated as "Village to the Side" or "Village Set Back (from the shore)," and its leader, Maḣpiya Wicạ ṡṭa (Cloud Man), who existed alongside the lake shore in the 1830s. The three artists made different contributions to the installation, which is centered around a circle of stones and a walking path edged with an etched railing featuring plants that were important to the villagers. Smith was particularly involved with creating a website, which features images of the installation and site, historical information and video interviews with modern Dakota people.

== Notable works ==
- Her Giveaway: A Spiritual Journey with AIDS (1988), short film.
- Honored by the Moon (1990), short film.
- Cloudy Waters: Dakota Reflections on the River (2004), public art installation.
- City Indians (2006): art exhibition.
- Bdote Memory Map (2012): interactive map.
- Bde Maka Ska Public Art Project (2020 and beyond): public art installation at Bde Maka Ska.
