= Carole LaFavor =

American activist and writer

Carole S. LaFavor (1942–2011) was an Ojibwe novelist, Native American rights activist and nurse. Known for her HIV/AIDS activism, she was featured in Mona Smith's 1988 film Her Giveway about her experiences living with the disease. Her two novels, Along the Journey River and Evil Dead Center were both published by Firebrand Books and her essay "Walking the Red Road" appears in the anthology Positive Women: Voices of Women Living with AIDS edited by Andrea Rudd and Darien Taylor.

== Personal life ==
LaFavor was born in Minnesota on February 12, 1942 and identified as two-spirit and lesbian.

In 1983, laFavor spoke of her rape by two white men during the proceedings of the Minneapolis Antipornography Civil Rights Ordinance.

== HIV/AIDS work ==
LaFavor worked with the Minnesota American Indian AIDS Task Force and was a member of the President's Advisory Council on HIV/AIDS from 1995 to 1997, where she served as the only Native American member. Diagnosed with HIV in 1986, she was a founding member of Positively Native, an organisation that supports Native American people with HIV/AIDS. LaFavor promoted the use of traditional medicine for Native Americans with HIV/AIDS and urged Native Americans to reintegrate into tribal nations and communities to help Native women receive culturally appropriate HIV/AIDS support.

== Death ==
LaFavor died on November 21, 2011.

== Bibliography ==
- Along the Journey River (1996)
- Evil Dead Center (1998)
