= Marl lake =

Alkaline lake rich in calcium carbonate

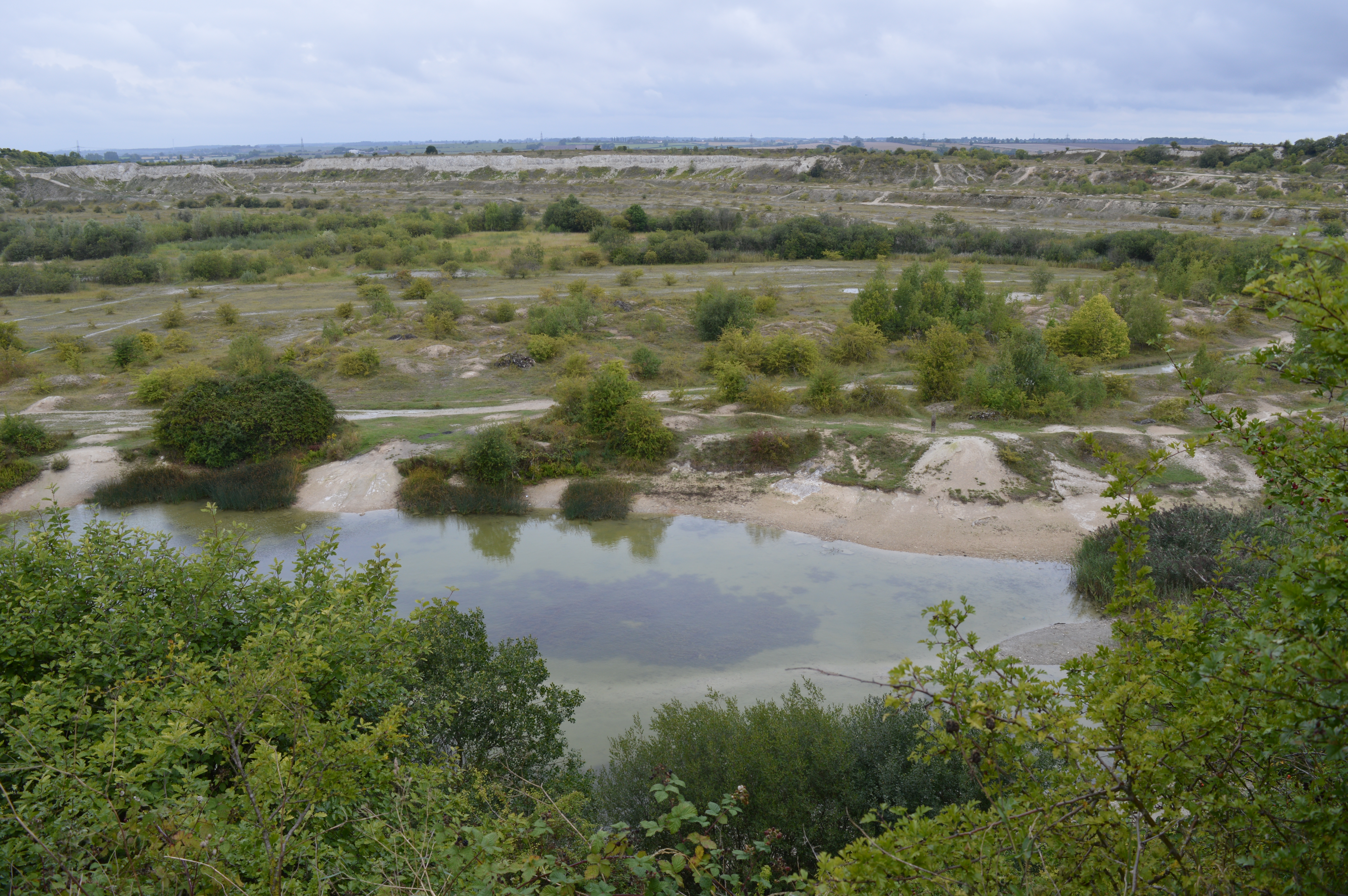
One of the Houghton Regis Marl Lakes

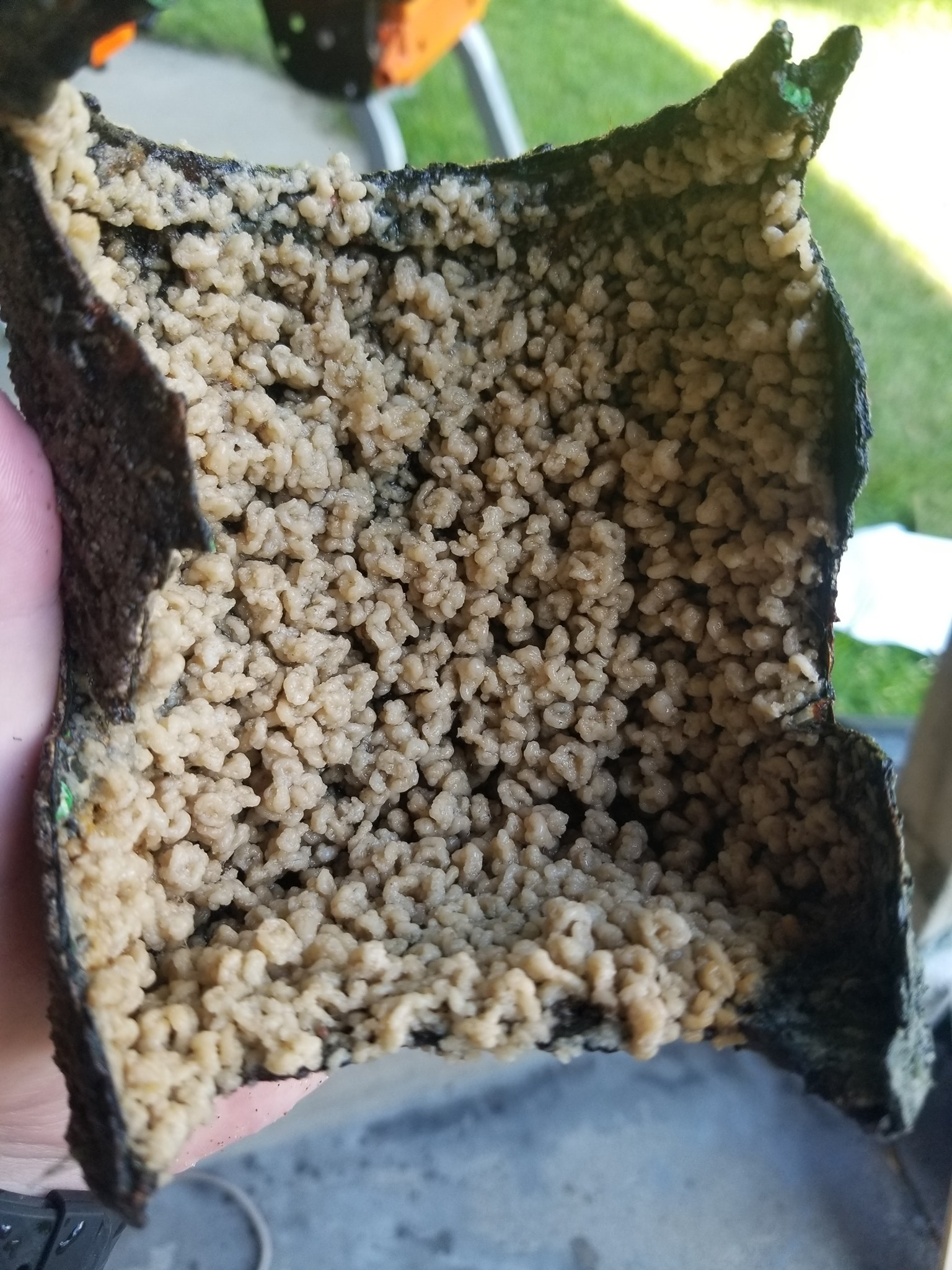
Deposition from a Marl lake inside a sheltered paint can, taken from Siseebakwet Lake

A marl lake is a type of alkaline lake whose bottom sediments include large deposits of marl, a mixture of clay and carbonate minerals. The term is particularly applied to lakes that have been dredged or mined for marl, often for manufacturing Portland cement.

Marl lakes are found around the Great Lakes of North America, in Britain, and in other areas that were once glaciated. They support distinctive ecological communities that are vulnerable to damage from silting, nutrient pollution, drainage, and invasive species.

== Description ==
Marl lakes typically are found in areas that were recently glaciated, and they often fill kettle depressions left behind by melting glaciers. Their most distinctive characteristic is that they deposit sediments rich in calcium carbonate. More precisely, a marl lake is a lake in which calcium carbonate makes up at least 50% of the dry weight of the inorganic fraction of the surface sediments. In some lakes, the sediments are almost pure calcium carbonate.

The calcium carbonate precipitates from lake water that is alkaline, typically with a pH 8.0 or greater, and has a high concentration of divalent ions and is low in dissolved organic compounds. The concentration of calcium carbonate in the lake water usually exceeds 100 mg per liter. Young marl lakes are sometimes visually stunning, with very fine suspended crystals of calcium carbonate giving the water an opaque light blue color.

In Britain, marl lakes are of glacial origin and are shallow (less than 4 meters or 13 feet deep). They are associated with carbonate bedrock or bedrock of the Old Red Sandstone. Their concentration of calcium carbonate is 140 mg/L, typical of temperate limestone groundwater.

The precipitation of calcium carbonate from marl lakes is a consequence of removal of carbon dioxide by photosynthesis (particularly by Chara, stonewort, which becomes encrusted with low-magnesium calcite during the summer) or outgassing of saturated groundwater, or as a result of the common-ion effect.

Higgins Lake, in central Michigan, US, is the only known location of freshwater oolites. These are found in a narrow band between a beach rich in clastic sediments and deeper water below wave base.

== Ecology ==
Marl lakes of the upper Great Lakes region have a very low biological productivity. They typically are very sparse in macrophytes (macroscopic plants and algae), and their productivity is dominated by one macrophyte species, Scirpus subterminalis (water bulrush), which is responsible for an average of 79% of the total biomass. Chara (stonewort) accounts for 12% of the biomass but limited to the most shallow, protected parts of the lake. Potamogeton (pondweed) provides most of the remaining biomass.

Marl lakes often contain lakemounts. These are thought to begin with thin patches in the original kettle ice, which were colonized by Najas, Potamogeton, and Chara. These locally enhanced the sediment deposition rate to build up the lakemounts to near the lake surface. The lakes are often surrounded by beachrock composed of cemented pisoliths (calcite concretions) and gastropod shells. The shallow beachrock slopes are inhabited by Chara.

British marl lakes are dominated by Chara, which is the source of the marl. By contrast with marl lakes of the Great Lakes region, they have a rich emergent and submerged macrophyte community. They are also home to many gastropods and crustaceans.

Iron is a limiting nutrient in marl lakes, as it is practically insoluble in oxygenated, alkaline water. To be available at all, it must be chelated by organic matter. But because the primary productivity is low, organic matter is scarce; this means there is little chelation of iron, which keeps primary productivity low in a vicious cycle. Phosphate, another essential nutrient, is precipitated along with carbonates, further reducing the supply of nutrients.

Some marl lakes are meromictic lakes in which bottom water never mixes with surface water. Green Lake, at Fayetteville, New York, is a meromictic marl lake containing a cyanobacterial thrombolitic bioherm.

Marl lakes are ecologically important, but are vulnerable to damage by silting, nutrient pollution, drainage, and invasive species. To some extent, the high calcium content of marl lake water buffers it against phosphate, but the native ecological community is sensitive even to small changes in chemistry and the introduction of nutrient pollution renders the lake more hospitable to invasive species. Eventually a threshold is reached at which the lake rapidly loses its marl characteristics and flowering plants replace Chara. In Britain, only the marl lakes of the more remote parts of northern Scotland are likely to remain pristine into the near future. Many are transient or eutrophic, and at least half those in Britain have been affected by nutrient pollution.

== As records of climate changes ==
Marl ponds steadily deposit sediments that can be dated by carbon-14. They also contain proxies for local climate. For example, the sediments of Pretty Lake in Indiana, USA, contain chlorophyll degradation products from which its history of biological productivity can be estimated. This record shows a peak in productivity during the Boreal Age (9 to 7.6 thousand years ago) and another peak at about 6000 years ago.

Wallywash Great Pond in Jamaica is an unusual tropical marl lake whose sediments also record climate fluctuations. Cores of the bottom sediments show deposition of marls during wet periods and sea highstands; organic-rich sediments during intervals of swampy conditions; and calcareous brown mud suggesting periods when the pond was an ephemeral lake. These cores record climate from the last interglacial, around 120,000 years ago, to nearly the present.

== Exploitation ==
The carbonate-rich sediments deposited by marl lakes is a mixture of clay and carbonate minerals described as marl. Marl lakes have frequently been dredged or mined for marl, often used for manufacturing Portland cement.
