= Bdote Memory Map =

The Bdote Memory Map is an interactive online map and website by which the Dakota people trace their history and passed down memory of Bdóte—the region that is now referred to as the Twin Cities area in Minnesota. It allows viewers to explore the history of the region as told from an Indigenous perspective. With video, audio, and other multimedia forms, the map provides the voices of Native speakers to tell their personal and ancestral stories of the region at the junction of the Mississippi and Minnesota Rivers, known by the Dakota people as Bdote, meaning "where the two waters come together".

== History ==
Mona Smith, a Sisseton-Wahpeton Dakota videographer, helped create the Bdote Memory Map in partnership with the Minnesota Humanities Center. The Memory Map grew out of a 2006 multimedia exhibition Mona Smith put on at the Ancient Traders Gallery entitled "City Indians," reflecting the seemingly ironic term attached to Dakota living in the Twin Cities. Smith, however, wished to express how the cities grew in areas that were already their land, the bdote. After the Minnesota Humanities Center extended funding, what began as a map of the region where Native Americans could attach post-it notes of their memories eventually became the online Bdote Memory Map.

== Website layout ==
When first entering the website, a four sided wheel, representing the traditional Dakota Medicine Wheel, prompts the visitor to explore the map or other writings on the Dakota and information about the website. The map itself is an interactive map of the Bdote region. There are several physical markers on the map that viewers are encouraged to click on, from which a specific memory or story will emerge. These can take the form of videos, audio recordings, writings and more from Indigenous writers, artists, elders, students, and experts. Many of these writings will also prompt visitors with questions to reflect on the meaning of what they have learned. The website additionally includes teachers' guides for instruction on Indigenous peoples in the classroom, informational resources about the Dakota, American Indian legal histories, as well as a variety of historical maps of both the Bdote and the larger Americas as well.

== Current and future developments ==
The Bdote Memory Map is still soliciting Indigenous memories and stories of the Bdote region today to add to its platform. Smith is hoping to eventually expand the map's area of coverage to include Indigenous stories from throughout the entire Mississippi region down to Louisiana.
