= Mendota Mdewakanton Dakota Tribal Community =

Dakota community centered in Mendota, Minnesota

- Mendota Mdewakanton Dakota Tribal Community logo

Total population
- 570

Regions with significant populations
- United States, (Minnesota)

Languages
- Dakota, American English

Mendota Mdewakanton Dakota Tribal Community is a Dakhóta community centered in Mendota, Minnesota. The Mendota Mdewakanton Dakota Tribal Community (MMDTC) is an organization that works to sustain and cultivate Dakhóta cultural practices, help their enrolled community members, relatives from other communities, the displaced Urban Indian population of the Twin Cities, and exercise tribal governance. The MMDTC is not federally recognized, however, it is in the process of seeking federal recognition by the US Bureau of Indian Affairs. The community offers activities such as an annual pow wow, spiritual and cultural outlets, teachings and venues, formal Dakota language instruction, and is actively engaged with partnerships and collaborations with sister Dakhóta communities, organizations, and the broader Seven Council Fires diaspora in Minnesota and beyond.

== History ==
The Dakhóta people are the original inhabitants of the land that is now known as Minnesota, specifically centered around the modern day Twin Cities, Mille Lacs Lake, and Minnesota River Valley. The name "Minnesota" comes from the Dakota "Mni Sota," which was used as the name for the Minnesota River and means "cloudy water," which was then used by settlers as the name for the entire state. The Minnesota River has a strong cultural significance for the Dakota people as the place where it joins the Mississippi River, in Saint Paul, Minnesota, is known as Bdóte, which the Dakota people consider to be the place they were created. This is close to other important sites to the Dakota people, including Oheyawahi-Pilot Knob and Coldwater Spring.

=== European contact ===
Before American colonists made contact with them, Dakota people had lost much of their northern lands in wars with the Ojibwe people, who themselves had been forced westward in conflicts with colonists and had therefore acquired the advantage of guns and ammunition before the Dakota. The first official contact between the Dakota and the United States Government was the 1805 Pike's Treaty, in which the U.S. was able to establish a military fortress, Fort Snelling, and the land that became the Minneapolis–Saint Paul metropolitan area. This meant the loss of the area around Bdóte, and so the heart of the Dakota land. Many treaties were later signed with the U.S., sequestering the Dakota people into smaller plots of land with each successive treaty, culminating in the conflict known as the U.S.-Dakota War.

=== U.S.-Dakota War of 1862 ===
The U.S. Dakota war was incited when U.S. officials refused to provide promised food items and goods, leading to widespread starvation and death within the Dakota reservations, particularly along the Minnesota River. Dakota men therefore took up arms against the white settlers around them for their promised food and security, and ultimately their freedom from the colonists. A main figure in this conflict was Taoyateduta (Little Crow), a Dakota chief. The Dakota led by Little Crow were ultimately defeated by the US Government, and noncombatants were then placed in a concentration camp near Fort Snelling, on Wita Tanka. After trials were held against those Dakota people who participated in the war, President Abraham Lincoln ordered the execution of 38 Dakota men in Mankato, the largest mass execution in U.S. history. Following this, the remainder of the Dakota in the Fort Snelling camp were ordered into exile outside of the state of Minnesota.

== Formation ==
The thiyóšpaye (community) historically known as Ȟaȟa Mdote has long existed at the confluence of the Minnesota and Mississippi Rivers. After contact with European traders in the 18th Century, a bustling market developed in the area, and Dakhóta peoples, as well as other Native Nations, came to the area for trade. In the 19th century, this trade expanded and settlers began to arrive in force. The Dakhóta were eventually violently suppressed in the Dakota War of 1862, and following the war and further hostilities to the west, a small community of Dakhóta people managed to cling to their village, currently known as Mendota. This community persevered despite the hardships of the second half of the 19th century, and persists to the present day in its historical location as a distinct tribal entity. The Mendota Mdewakanton Dakota Tribal Community nonprofit 501(c)(3) was officially formed in 1996 in Mendota, Minnesota, to assist community members with their affairs.

=== Highway 55 reroute ===
Shortly after the formation of the MMDTC, the community was a prominent body in the protest of the rerouting of Highway 55, whose proposed route threatened important Dakota sites such as Coldwater Springs. The Mendota community, along with the American Indian Movement and Earth First!, fought for the Minnesota Department of Transportation to adjust its plans to preserve these spaces. After years of protesting, in which the protesters faced violent police raids and winter conditions, and court proceedings, MNDOT consented to install a lining that would protect the water source of the spring, thereby allowing construction of the highway while protecting the natural habitat.

== Federal recognition ==
The Mendota Dakhóta Community has aspired to formal recognition by the United States Government for generations, and formal efforts in that regard have taken place since the 1990s. The Community has been hampered by obstacles both financial and administrative, but hopes to submit its first complete formal petition under US CFR 34 in the near future.

== Cultural practices ==
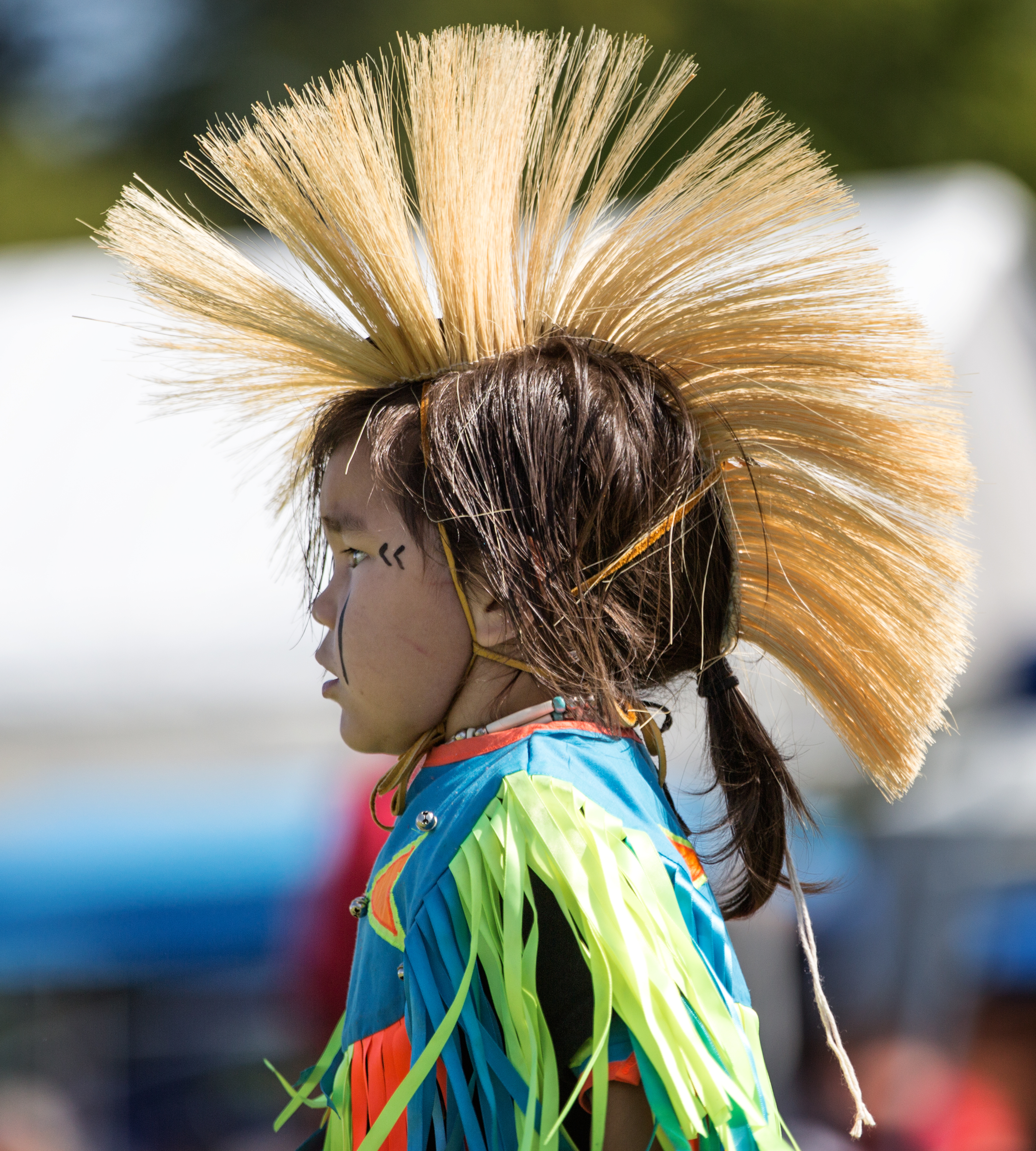
A child at the Mendota 18th Annual Wacipi (Powwow) on the St Peter's Church grounds in Mendota, Minnesota

The cultural practices of the Mendota Community look much the same as the broader Dakota people's, carried down from pre-colonial times. The Mendota Community offers formal instruction in the Dakota language (Dakhóta Iapi) and in cultural, foodways, and spiritual activities. In addition, the Community governs its affairs via a formal Constitution, and in keeping with broader Dakhóta practice, is ultimately governed by its General Council, which consists of all voting members. The Tribal Council is elected to terms of four years, and manages daily administration. The next regularly scheduled election is in 2028.
