= Oheyawahi-Pilot Knob =

- U.S. National Register of Historic Places
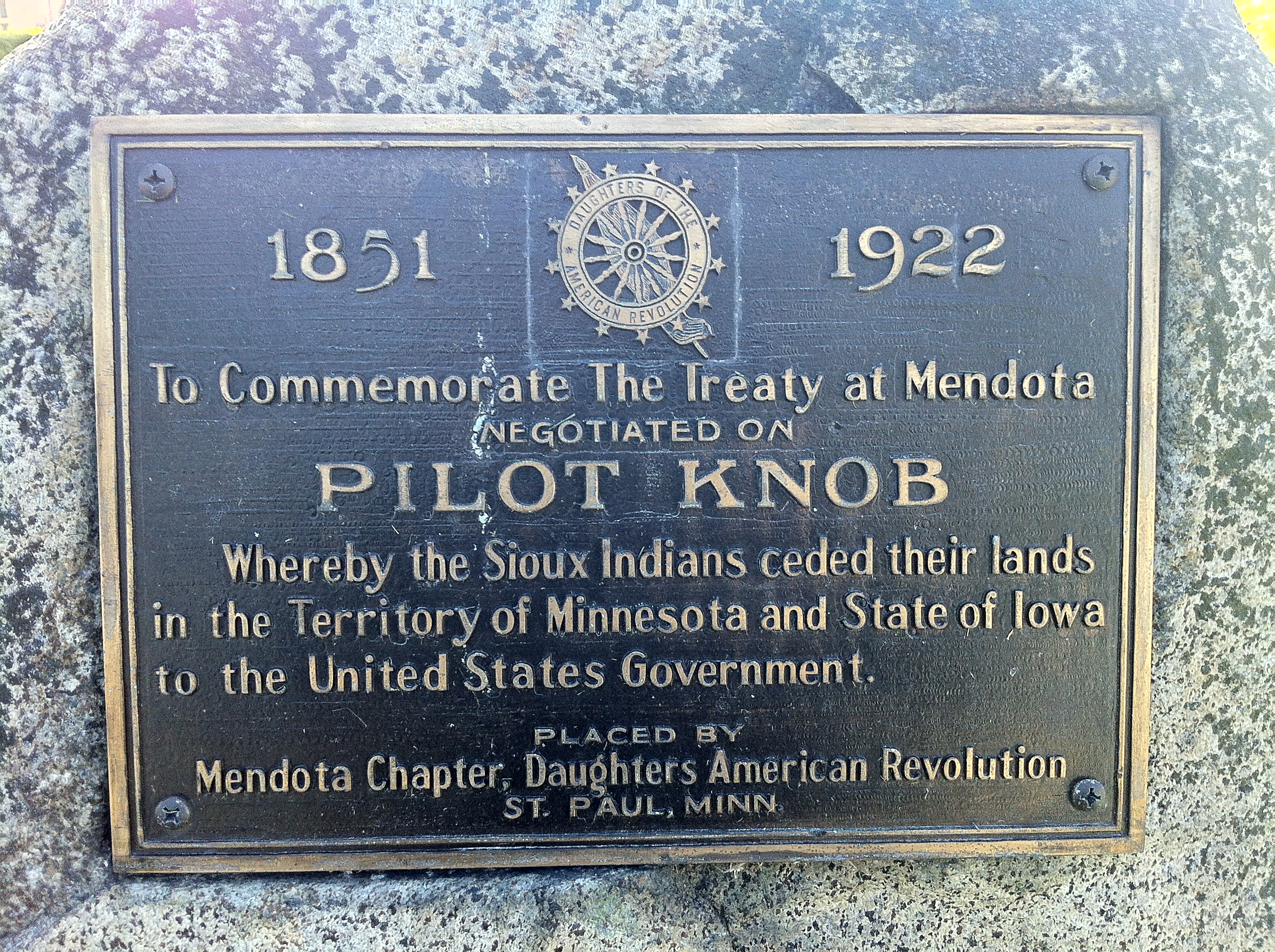
- DAR marker at Oheyawahi-Pilot Knob

- Location within Minnesota Location within the United States
- Location: Off MN 55 at the north end of Pilot Knob road, Mendota Heights, Dakota County, Minnesota
- Coordinates: 44°52′49.37″N 93°10′2.2″W
- NRHP reference No.: 03001374_R
- Added to NRHP: March 14, 2017

Oheyawahi-Pilot Knob (Dakota: Oȟéyawahe, lit. 'a sacred place much visited; the place where people go for burials') is a scenic overlook, and a Native American gathering place and burial ground in Mendota Heights, Minnesota, United States. The overlook provides views of the confluence of the Minnesota and Mississippi Rivers, Fort Snelling, and the Minneapolis and St. Paul skylines. It was the site of the 1851 Treaty of Mendota between the United States federal government and the Dakota people of Minnesota, who consider the site sacred. In 2017, Oheyawahi-Pilot Knob was listed on the National Register of Historic Places.

== Early history ==
The name Oheyawahi means "a sacred place much visited; the place where people go for burials". It had long been sacred to the Dakota people. Descriptions by early white settlers demonstrate its continued use by the Dakota in the 19th century: Charles La Trobe described a tomb of an Indian chief at the summit of the hill in 1832–1833, French explorer, Joseph Nicollet, described a "great gathering of people" on the hill and observed a Dakota medicine dance in 1837, and Mary Henderson Eastman described Pilot Knob as "proud to be the burial place of her warrior children...." French settlers called the hill La Butte des Morts (Knoll of the Dead). These observations have been supported by a modern-day analysis of skeletal remains found on the hill which included individuals of both Native American and European origin.

In the 19th century, the hill became a reference point for riverboat pilots navigating the Minnesota River Valley, leading to the name ''Pilot Knob''.

In 1848, Illinois Senator Stephen Douglas suggested that Mendota Heights should be the location of Minnesota’s territorial capital with the public buildings on Pilot Knob. He described “The beauty and fitness of Mendota’s situation at the junction of the two rivers, with the Pilot Knob peak as a grand place for the capitol building, with its beautiful and extensive view. . . .” (The capital was located at St. Paul instead, at the urging of Henry Hastings Sibley, Minnesota's first governor.)

The Treaty of Mendota was signed at Pilot Knob in 1851. The treaty ceded 25 million acres (10,000×10^{3} ha) of land west of the Mississippi (much of southern Minnesota) to the U.S. government.

During the Dakota War of 1862, Dakota people were forced into an internment camp on nearby Pike Island. Some of the many Dakota who died that winter were buried on Pilot Knob.

== Modern use ==
The land remained largely undeveloped until 1925 when 140 acres (57 ha) were purchased for the formation of Acacia Park Cemetery. During the landscaping for the cemetery, the top 20 feet of the "knob" was removed.

In 2002, a private developer announced plans to build high-density housing on 27 acres (11 ha) of the hill. The proposal was criticized by members of the Dakota and Ojibwe communities, archaeologists, environmentalists, historians, and local residents, and led to the formation of the nonprofit Pilot Knob Preservation Association. The association sought to have the site recognized as an important cultural and historic site. The Trust for Public Land purchased 8.5 acres (3.4 ha) in 2005, and sold it to the City of Mendota Heights. The purchase was a collaborative effort by the Trust ($120,000), the city of Mendota Heights ($400,000), the Minnesota Department of Natural Resources ($1,050,000), Dakota County ($400,000), and the Pilot Knob Preservation Association. The city purchased an additional 25 acres (10 ha) from 2006–2008 through funding from a combination of public and private sources.

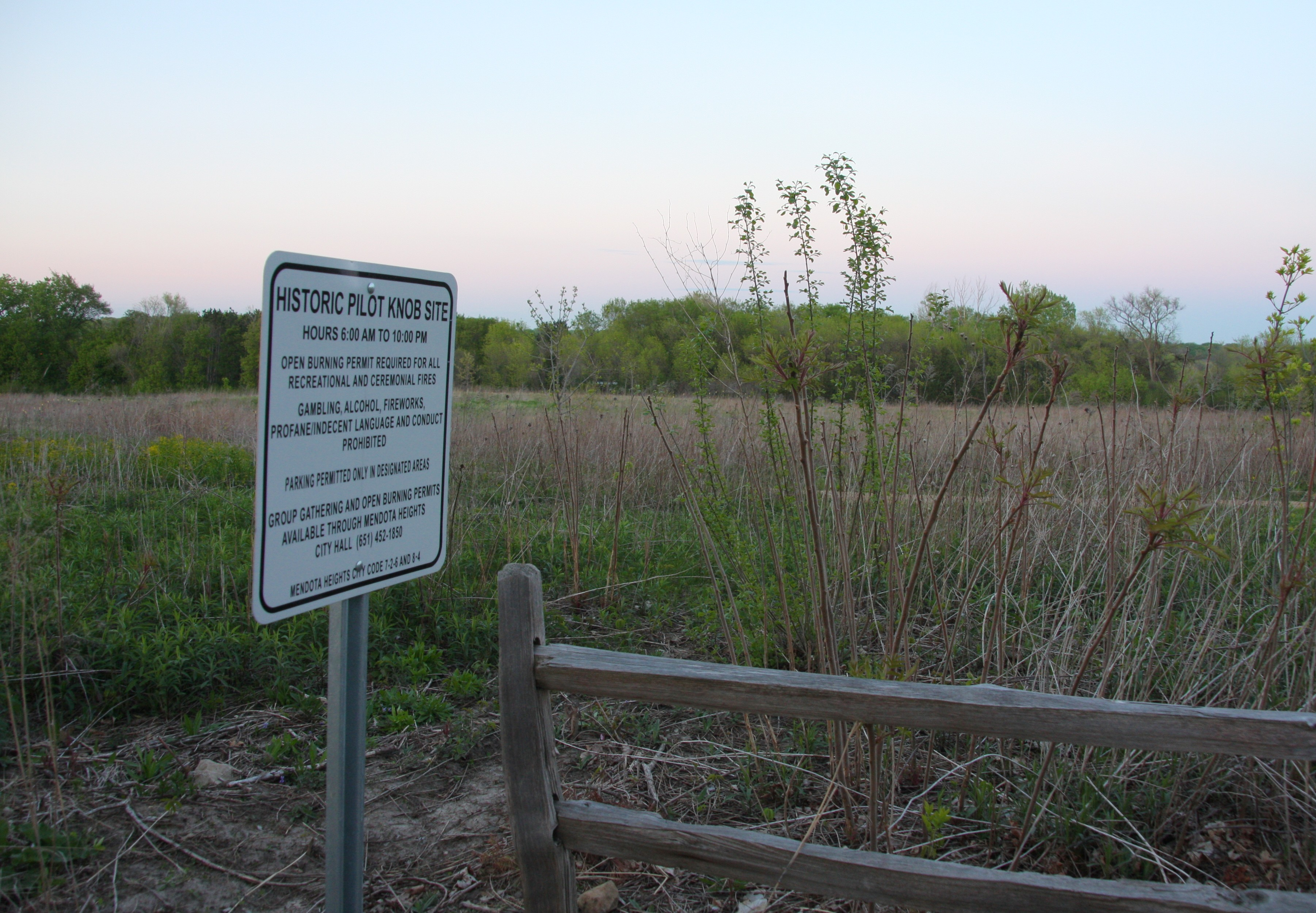
The site in 2017

The 25 acres (10 ha) (plus 9 already owned by the city) is undergoing restoration to oak savanna, led by Great River Greening, a local non-profit. Conservation grazing (using horses, goats, and sheep), has been used to help restore and maintain native grassland. A trail system was established, including three scenic overlooks, which hooks up with the Big Rivers Regional Tail. The site is situated within the Mississippi Flyway, a bird migratory route that goes from central Canada to the Gulf of Mexico.

In 2017, the 125-acre (51 ha) historic site, including the land owned by Mendota Heights, was added to the NRHP. The historic site includes public and private land, a cemetery and several homes. It overlooks Pike Island where the Mississippi and Minnesota rivers come together, Fort Snelling, Saint Peter's Church (the oldest church in Minnesota), and the Mendota Bridge on Minnesota State Highway 55. In the distance, the skylines of Minneapolis and Saint Paul are clearly visible.

Present-day Pilot Knob Road climbs the south side of the Oheyawahi-Pilot Knob hill, passes Acacia Park Cemetery at the summit, and ends just over the hilltop. In the opposite direction, Pilot Knob Road continues south to Dakota County 50/212th St W, on the border between Lakeville and Farmington.

== See also ==
- Mendota Mdewakanton Dakota Tribal Community
