= Roger Awsumb =

American TV host and radio broadcaster

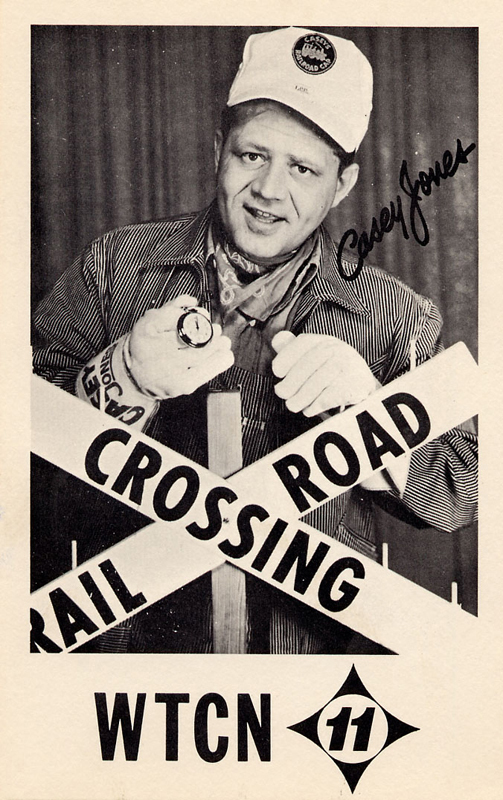
- Born: Roger Leonard Awsumb; 10 July 1928; Saint Paul, Minnesota, US
- Died: 15 July 2002 (aged 74); Brainerd, Minnesota, US
- Resting place: Acacia Park Cemetery, Mendota Heights
- Other name: "Casey Jones"
- Education: Macalester College
- Occupation: Television personality
- Known for: Lunch With Casey TV show
- Notable work: Casey's Comedy Album For Kids
- Parents: Ardin I. Awsumb; Petra C. Awsumb
- Honours: Minnesota Broadcasting Hall of Fame

Roger Awsumb (July 10, 1928 – July 15, 2002) was an American television show host and radio broadcaster in Minneapolis–Saint Paul and Brainerd, Minnesota. He is most known for his lead role in the children's television show he created, Lunch With Casey, that aired on the Twin Cities area channel 11 from 1954 until 1973. Awsumb exemplified the pre-syndication era of local children's television that featured a lead performer-host in character – in Awsumb's case, as a railroad engineer.

== Early life ==
Roger Leonard Awsumb was born on July 10, 1928, in Saint Paul, Minnesota to Ardin I. Awsumb of Saint Paul, Minnesota, and Petra C. (née Johnson) Awsumb of Trondheim, Norway. He was of Norwegian descent from both parents and the youngest of four children. His siblings were Ardin W., Kenneth P., and Doris V. Awsumb. Roger Awsumb graduated from Saint Paul's Central High School in 1946. After serving in the United States Army from 1946 to 1947, he attended Macalester College, where he began his radio career, graduating in 1950.

== Career ==
=== Beginnings ===
During a brief stint in 1951 at radio station KDLM in Detroit Lakes, Minnesota, Awsumb developed a Casey Jones children's show that became the basis of television career. Awsumb returned to the Twin Cities in 1952 and transitioned from radio to television. He began making on-air appearances as a railroad engineer named “Casey Jones” in 1954 on WMIN-TV with the character and concept quickly evolving into its own show. The show continued on channel 11 when WMIN-TV was absorbed into WTCN-TV, which had shared the channel since its sign-on in 1953.

=== Lunch With Casey ===
The top-rated Lunch With Casey show was part of the peak era of children's television programming in the United States. His noon-hour show featured jokes, skits, songs, and cartoons, with non-actor children joining Awsumb and other characters live on set for the fun. Awsumb is most remembered for playing the ukulele and singing "The Happy Birthday Song" during each show. It's disputed whether he or musician Jim Hobbins wrote the tune. Awsumb and his supporting cast filled up an hour-long block of television air time each weekday with mostly original content. Despite airing thousands of shows over its run, only a few recordings of Lunch With Casey exist today as each episode was broadcast live; any shows that were recorded were mostly not retained because videotape was expensive and often reused.

=== New era of children's television ===
WTCN-TV first attempted to drop the Lunch With Casey show in 1960 in favor of national programming. But the station rehired the cast after receiving 10,000 protest letters from parents and children. Awsumb and pioneering children's television hosts of his era were further overshadowed by the arrival of nationally syndicated shows such as Mister Rogers’ Neighborhood and Sesame Street beginning in the late 1960s. Lunch With Casey's ratings faltered in the early 1970s, with fewer children going home from school for lunch, and it was later cancelled by a national media conglomerate that acquired the host station. Awsumb cited the backlash against children's television personalities endorsing products aimed at children for the wider cancellation in the early 1970s of local children's TV shows.

=== After Lunch With Casey ===
Cancellation of his show on channel 11 was not the end of Awsumb's Casey Jones persona as the host station did not own the characters. Awsumb and longtime sidekick Lynn Dwyer as Roundhouse Rodney released Casey's Comedy Album For Kids album in 1973. The album contained songs and jokes from the popular television show. Awsumb is credited with writing "The Happy Train" song. Awsumb continued to make public appearances as Casey Jones. However, attempts by Awsumb and other characters to reboot the Casey Jones concept and spin off new TV shows, including a short-lived show on channel 29, failed. Awsumb pursued other business ventures, including a pizza restaurant, automobile sales, and a bicycle and ski shop. Awsumb returned to radio broadcasting in the 1980s on KLKS (FM) in the Brainerd Lakes area before retiring for good in the early 1990s.

== Legacy ==
Awsumb did over 8,000 shows during his television tenure. His Casey Jones character is a beloved fixture for a generation of television viewers and he remains a television icon. His alma mater, Macalester College, presented him with the Distinguished Citizen Award in 1996. Awsumb was inducted into the Minnesota Broadcasting Hall of Fame in 2001. The steam locomotive Awsumb rode in the Lunch with Casey show opening is located at the Minnesota Transportation Museum in Saint Paul.

Roger Awsumb is buried at the Acacia Park Cemetery in Mendota Heights, Minnesota.
