= Acacia Park Cemetery, Mendota Heights =

Cemetery in Dakota County, Minnesota

Coordinates: 44.878194°N 93.170199°W

Acacia Park Cemetery
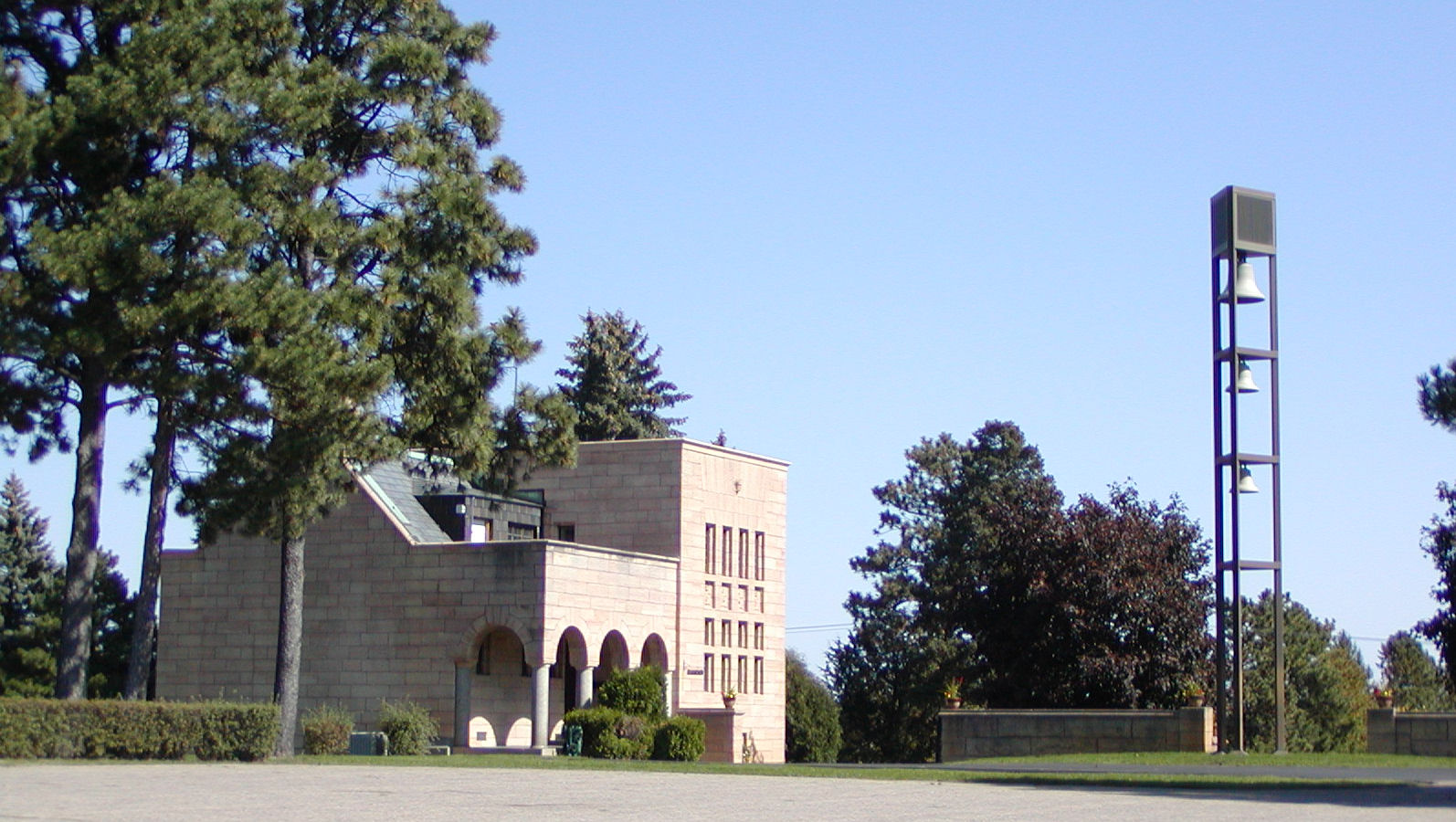
- Acacia Park Cemetery
- Interactive map of Acacia Park Cemetery

Details
- Established: 1925
- Size: 75 acres (30 ha)

Acacia Park Cemetery is a public cemetery on Oheyawahi-Pilot Knob hill, in Mendota Heights, Minnesota. Established in 1925, Acacia Park consists of 75 acres (300,000 m^{2}) of land overlooking the confluence of the Minnesota and Mississippi Rivers. Prior to acquisition by European settlers, Dakota people used the site as a sacred meeting place and burial ground.

The cemetery was founded when Twin Cities members of the Masonic order purchased 125 acres (51 ha) of land at Pilot Knob, Mendota Heights. It was originally intended for the exclusive use of Masons and their families, and the name of the cemetery derives from the acacia sprig used in Masonic burial rituals. Plans for the cemetery included a temple burial chapel, administration buildings, a 65 ft (20 m) monolith, and landscaping (which included removal of 20 feet from the top of the "knob"). Consistent with Masonic tradition, the graves were marked with only a simple, uniform slab bearing the deceased person's name with birth and death dates. The cemetery was officially opened on October 10, 1928, with a dedicatory speech by Minnesota governor Theodore Christianson.

In the 1970s, the cemetery was opened to general public use.

During the lifetime of the cemetery, skeletal remains have been uncovered; some of these remains were stored in a vault at the cemetery. In 2016, the co-mingled remains in the vault were examined at Hamline University and found to include individuals of both Native American and European background, demonstrating that the site has been important in rituals of both communities.

== Notable burials ==
- Awsumb, Roger (July 10, 1928 – July 15, 2002), television personality "Casey Jones"
- Holman, Charles W. (December 27, 1898 – May 17, 1931), record-holding aviator nicknamed "Speed"
- Densford, Katharine Jane (1890–1978), World War II nurse and director of the University of Minnesota School of Nursing
- Karl Kassulke (March 20, 1941 – October 26, 2008), professional football player
- Tom Keith (December 21, 1946 – October 30, 2011), radio personality with Minnesota Public Radio
- Stassen, Harold (April 13, 1907 – March 4, 2001), 25th Governor of Minnesota
- Louie Anderson (March 24, 1953 – January 21, 2022), stand-up comedian, actor and game show host
