= Kitchi Lake =

Lake in the state of Minnesota, United States

- Location within Minnesota
- Location: Beltrami County, Minnesota
- Coordinates: 47°29′56″N 94°30′47″W
- Type: lake

Kitchi Lake is a lake in Beltrami County, Minnesota, in the United States.

Kitchi is derived from an Ojibwe-language word meaning "big lake".

== See also ==
- List of lakes in Minnesota
