= Bdóte =

Location in Minnesota considered the center of the universe in Dakota tradition

Coordinates: 44°53′49″N 93°9′1″W

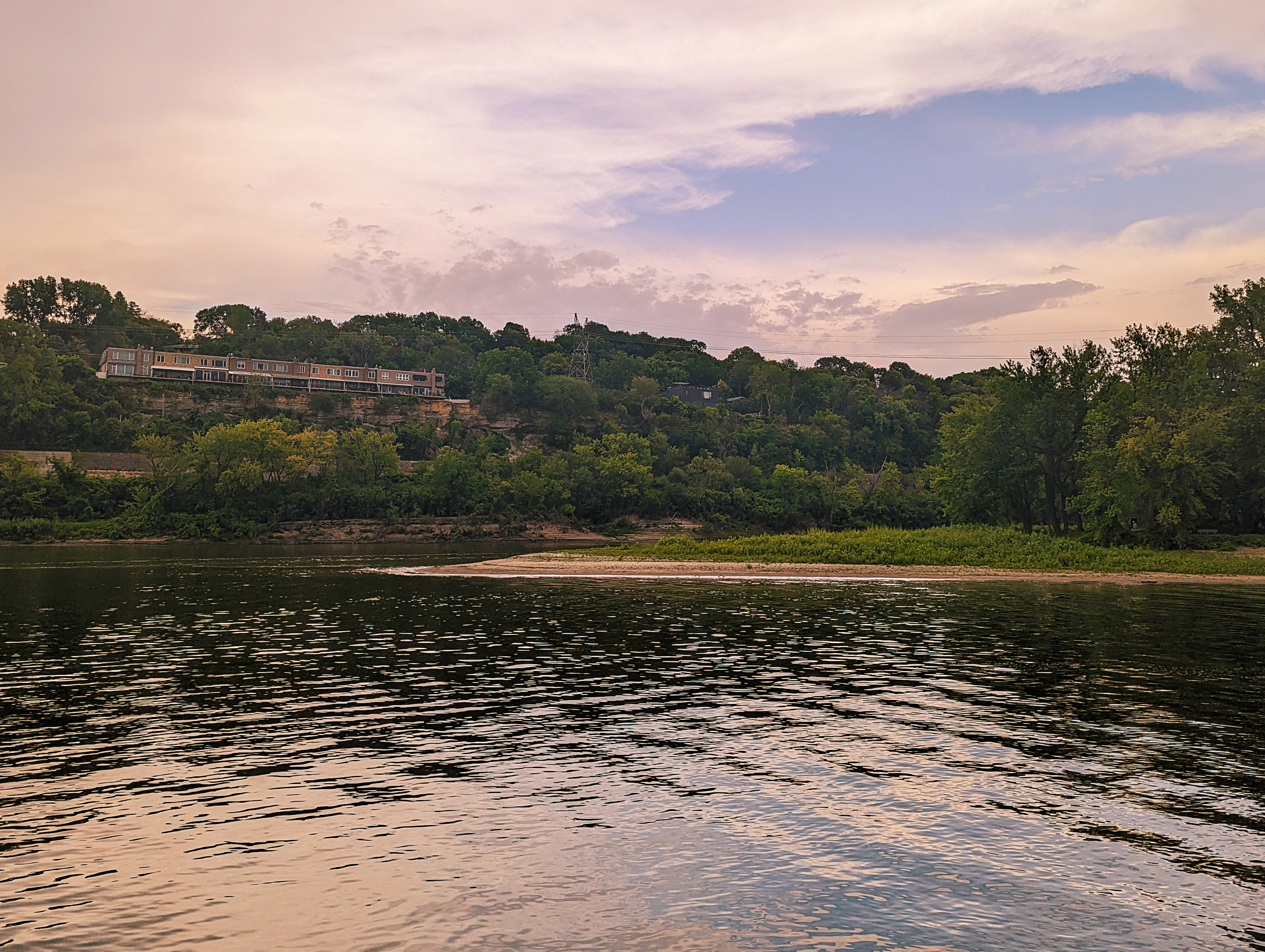
Confluence of the Minnesota and Mississippi Rivers at Bdote (Pike Island, Minnesota)

Bdóte (English: /bəˈdoʊteɪ/ bə-DOH-tay; lit. 'place where two rivers meet' or 'confluence'; deprecated spelling Mdote) is a significant Dakota sacred landscape where the Minnesota and Mississippi Rivers meet, encompassing Pike Island, Fort Snelling, Coldwater Spring, Indian Mounds Park, and surrounding areas in present-day Minneapolis and Saint Paul, Minnesota, United States. In Dakota geographic memory, it is a single contiguous area not delineated by any contemporary areas' borders. According to Dakota oral tradition, it is the site of creation; the interconnectedness between the rivers, earth, and sky are important to the Dakota worldview and the site maintains its significance to the Dakota people.

It is also an important location in the history of European colonization of the region, including the 1805 Treaty of St. Peters with the Dakota people and the 1837 Treaty of St. Peters with the Ojibwe. After the Dakota War of 1862, it was the location of the concentration camp of the Dakota people before they were forcibly exiled from Minnesota. The cities of Mendota and Mendota Heights, Minnesota, which are part of Bdote, take their names from the Dakota name for the region.

In recent years, a movement to recognize and protect Bdote as a sacred place has been growing.

== Etymology ==
In the Dakota language, bdote can refer to any place where two bodies of water converge and can be translated as the "mouth" of a body of water. A deprecated spelling is mdote.

== Sacred significance to the Dakota people ==
=== Cosmology ===
Numerous creation stories within the Dakota communities define their relationships with the land and the stars above, including the sacred sites in Bdote. Many Dakota people identify as part of the Wicahpi Oyate (Star Nation), having spiritually originated from the stars and come into being on the land. In one version, the Big Dipper represents the seven bands of the Dakota and Lakota, collectively known as the Oceti Sakowin (Seven Council Fires). According to another, told by Gwen Westerman, the Dakota came from Orion's Belt and through the Creator, they walked Caŋku Wanagi, the "spirit road" (Milky Way), and arrived at Bdote, later spreading out to establish the sacred sites in the surrounding areas.

At Bdote, two bluffs called Caṡḳe Taŋka and Caṡḳe Cistiŋna opened up the earth. The Creator used mud between the bluffs to form the first Dakota man and woman. The earth is called Ina for "mother" because it is where Dakota people came from. Ṡuŋġi (Dakota elder Reverend Gary Cavender) further explains, "In our Creation myth we the Dakota, the Seven Fires of the Dakota, came from the belt of Orion—the seven planets of the belt of Orion, the seven stars—and arrived at the convolution of the Minnesota and Mississippi Rivers, and so in some respects it is our Eden, and the land around there is sacred as well".

According to astronomer Jim Rock, Bdote refers to the "Dakota Makoce Cokaya Kin" (Dakota center of the universe). An ancient and important relationship between the land and stars is known by the Dakota term Kapemni, which means "as it is above, it is below". The Mississippi River is reflected above as the Milky Way, the Spirit Road, that life travels to this world and returns to. Burial mounds, including Oheyawahi-Pilot Knob and Indian Mounds Park within Bdote, are built along the bluffs overlooking the Mississippi River so that the ancestors are in a place of honor.

A newborn baby's first cry is referred to as bdote, which compares the importance of a person's first breath of air with the necessity of water for life.

=== Sacred sites ===
There are numerous sites sacred to the Dakota people within Bdote. The specific sites within Bdote are part of what gives the region its significance in Dakota tradition. Lakota Chief Arvol Looking Horse noted during a pipe ceremony on Pilot Knob Preservation (Oheyawahi) that these sacred sites are how Dakota people connect spiritually to the wider landscape. Prairie Island Dakota spiritual leader Chris Leith has said that Bdote's many sacred sites make it a "vortex" in the landscape. (Note: Westerman & White 2012, p. 214In October 2009 Lakota Chief Arvol Looking Horse participated in a pipe ceremony on Pilot Knob to celebrate the protection of the land on the hill from development, noting that sacred sites are for Dakota, Lakota, and Nakota peoples “power points, the grid” through which people interact with the landscape. From this point of view development, while damaging to the environmental characteristics of sacred places, sometimes reflects the energy and power found there. Chris Leith, the late spiritual leader of the Prairie Island Dakota, also present at the 2009 event, stated in a 2003 interview that Bdote, a site of creation for the Dakota that contains many sacred sites, was a “vortex” in the landscape. The very presence of Fort Snelling, the airport, and the complex freeway system there reflected the site’s powerful energy.)

- Mnísota Wakpá (Minnesota River)
- Oȟéyawahe (Pilot Knob Preservation)
- Wíta Tháŋka (Pike Island)
- Mniówe Sní (Coldwater Spring)
- Owámniyomni (St. Anthony Falls)

==== Ȟaȟáwakpa (Mississippi River) ====
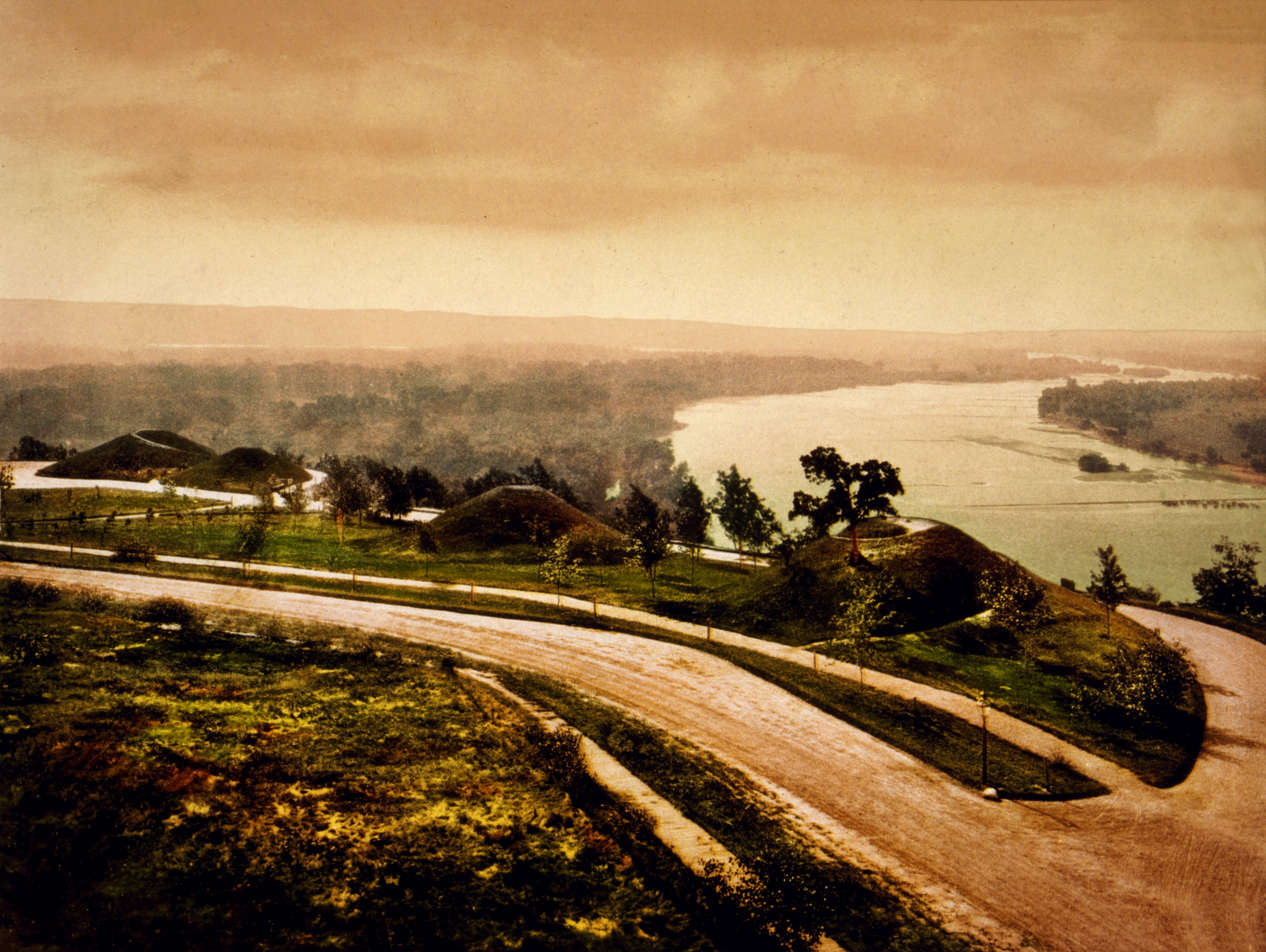
View of Indian Mounds Park (Saint Paul, Minnesota) along the bluffs of the Mississippi River, c. 1898

Ȟaȟáwakpa ("river of waterfalls", also known as the Mississippi River) was named after the many waterfalls that once cascaded over the bluffs, and the only natural waterfall on the Mississippi River, known in Dakota as Owámniyomni (St. Anthony Falls). Urban development of Minneapolis and Saint Paul led to the destruction of many of the falls or the removal of their water source. The river is reflected above in Dakota thought as the Milky Way, known in Dakota star knowledge as the Spirit Road on which people's spirits travel to and from earth during their birth and death. According to Dakota oral tradition, burial mounds were built along the bluffs to be close to the river of waterfalls and the spirit road. The river is also called Wakpá Tháŋka, the Great River, or less commonly Thaŋčháŋ Wakpa ("the body or principal part anything river").

==== Owámniyomni (St. Anthony Falls) ====
Owámniyomni ("whirlpool") is the Dakota name of St. Anthony Falls. As the only natural portage on the Mississippi River in the area, it was considered neutral territory and a practical meeting place for numerous tribes (including the Dakota, Hochunk and, later, the Ojibwe). Above the sacred falls is Wita Waste ("Beautiful Island" or Nicollet Island), an annual maple-sugar camp for the Dakota. Below the falls was an island known as Wita Wanagi ("Spirit Island"), which the U.S. Army Corps of Engineers destroyed in 1960 to dredge the site for boat passage. Wita Wanagi was a birthing place for Dakota women and also home to the spirit of Anpetu Sapa Win ("Clouded Day Woman"), whose death song could still be heard on the island.

==== Wakháŋ Thípi ====
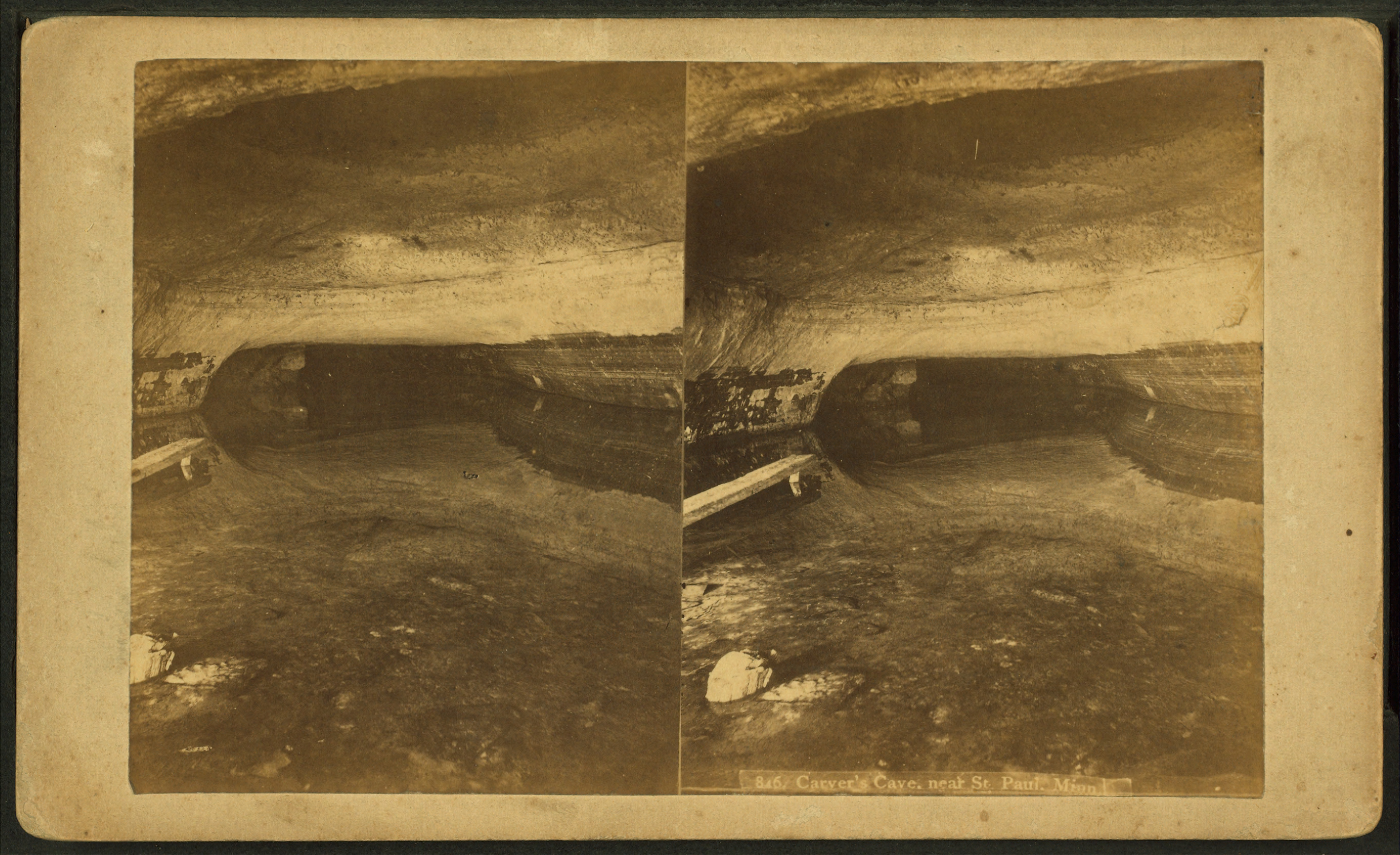
Stereoscopic view of Wakháŋ Thípi, c.1862?-1903

Wakháŋ Thípi ("dwelling place of the sacred", also known as Carver's Cave) is a spring-fed cave, sealed with an iron gate, within the Bruce Vento Nature Sanctuary. Dakota people believe it is home to an Uŋktehi (underwater serpent) that protects the water. Dakota midwife Autumn Cavendar-Wilson describes the cave as a historical safe location for generations of Dakota women to give birth that represents a womb on earth. The cave corresponds with Orion's Belt as a reflection on earth. There were petroglyphs of snakes that depicted the Dakota people's cosmic origin beliefs at Bdote and Wakháŋ Thípi. A railroad expansion project in the late 1800s destroyed the atrium of the cave that contained the petroglyphs.

=== Burial sites ===
Indian Mounds Regional Park, Oheyawahi-Pilot Knob Preservation Site, Mound Springs Park, and Grey Cloud Island are considered burial sites by Dakota people and parks by governing municipalities.

== Geography ==
Bdote refers to both a wider geographical area and the northeastern tip of Pike Island specifically, which is considered the exact area where the Mississippi River (Wakpá Táŋka) and Minnesota Rivers meet.

The exact area of wider Bdote varies by tradition, but generally encompasses Pike Island, Fort Snelling, Saint Anthony Falls, Coldwater Spring, and a stretch of the Minnesota and Mississippi Rivers. (Note: Westerman & White 2012, p. 20The area of Bdote (or Mdote) Mni Sota is located at the mouth of the Minnesota River where it flows into the Mississippi midway between the downtowns of Minneapolis and St. Paul. It is, according to Dakota oral traditions, a place of creation. The mouth of the Minnesota’s broad valley is located in a break in the high banks of the Mississippi corridor, a gorge deeply carved by the Falls of St. Anthony in its million-year journey up the river. This place was Bdote Mni Sota: bdote meaning "mouth"; mni sota referring to the clarity of the water and its reflection of the sky. The exact boundaries of Bdote Mni Sota are hard to determine. Sites generally considered to be within this sacred district include Mni Sni (Coldwater Spring) and Oheyawahi (Pilot Knob). Some Dakota include Ṭaḳu Wakaŋ Ṭip̣i (Carver’s Cave) and Mounds Park within this region as well.) (Note: Westerman & White 2012, p. 19This region where the rivers come together plays a significant role in the history of the Dakota people in Mni Sota Makoce, as it contains Ṭaḳu Wakaŋ Tip̣i, Mni Sni or Coldwater Spring, and Oheyawahi or Pilot Knob.) It has no English name and is popularly known by its Dakota name, Bdóte. Its role in Dakota tradition is sometimes described in English as "the center", a site that is the start of all life. (Note: Westerman & White 2012, p. 15We have recognized Bdote as the center of the earth and of all things, and historical accounts tell of it as a meeting place where massive gatherings of lodges took place annually.) (Note: Westerman & White 2012, p. 19"More than one hundred years later, missionary Stephen R. Riggs wrote, 'The Mdewakanton think that the mouth of the Minnesota River is precisely over the center of the earth, and that they occupy the gate that opens into the western world.'")

The rivers and island are south of Minneapolis and St. Paul and north of Mendota, Minnesota. Most of the Bdote area is administered by the state as part of the Fort Snelling state park and historic site, or Minneapolis-Saint Paul International Airport, while Crosby Farm Park and Hidden Falls are St. Paul city parks. Coldwater Spring (Mniówe Sní), along with Saint Anthony Falls (Owámniyomni, lit. "whirlpool"), are under federal jurisdiction as part of the Mississippi National River and Recreation Area.

== History ==
=== Dakota villages and settlements ===
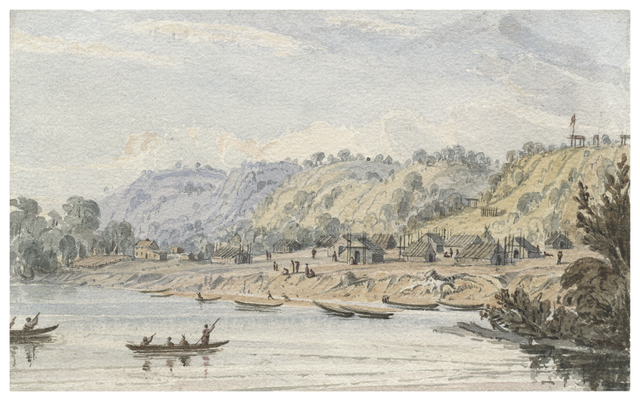
A painting representing Kaposia, Dakota village, by Seth Eastman c. 1846

Because the Dakota observed a seasonal migration pattern, a number of villages and settlements were noted in the Bdote area. In the location-based Dakota history book Mni Sota Makoce, Westerman and White posit that burial mounds correlate with village locations, because some mound research has revealed relationships between Dakota seasonal settlement and mound activity. This relationship is already noted in Dakota oral traditions.

Villages settled in a similar area each year, though the exact location varied. For example, in 1805 Kaposia (Kap’oża) was noted at the site of present-day Mounds Park in St. Paul, and around the time of the Treaty of 1837, Kaposia moved from the east bank of the Mississippi River to the west bank (a place now called Kaposia Landing Park and Kaposia Indian Site), and in 1853 Kaposia moved again due to provisions in the Treaty of Mendota. Sites in Bdote were more likely summer villages, where spring flooding made travel by canoe more convenient.

- Kaposia (Kap’oża): Near Mounds Park and Bruce Vento Nature Sanctuary
- Black Dog village (Ohaŋska): Near the present-day site of Fort Snelling
- Ḣeyate Otunwe: Maḣpiya Wic̣aṡṭa (Cloud Man)'s village on Bde Maka Ska, where Dakota experimented with Western-style sedentary agricultural practices. Cloud Man died in the Fort Snelling concentration camp at Wíta Tháŋka (Pike Island) in the winter of 1862-1863.

=== Treaty of St. Peters ===
At Bdote, Zebulon Pike met with the Dakota and signed the 1805 Treaty of St. Peters, also known as Pike's Purchase. Two of the seven Dakota leaders agreed to sell the land, eventually receiving only $2,000 when it was valued by Pike at $200,000, along with the agreement to build a fort at the location. In 1820, the Dakota granted ownership of where the two rivers meet on Bdote (Pike Island) to Pelagie Ainse, the daughter of a French fur trader and a Dakota woman. She was married to Jean-Baptiste Faribault and was the mother of Alexander Faribault.

=== Fort Snelling concentration camp ===
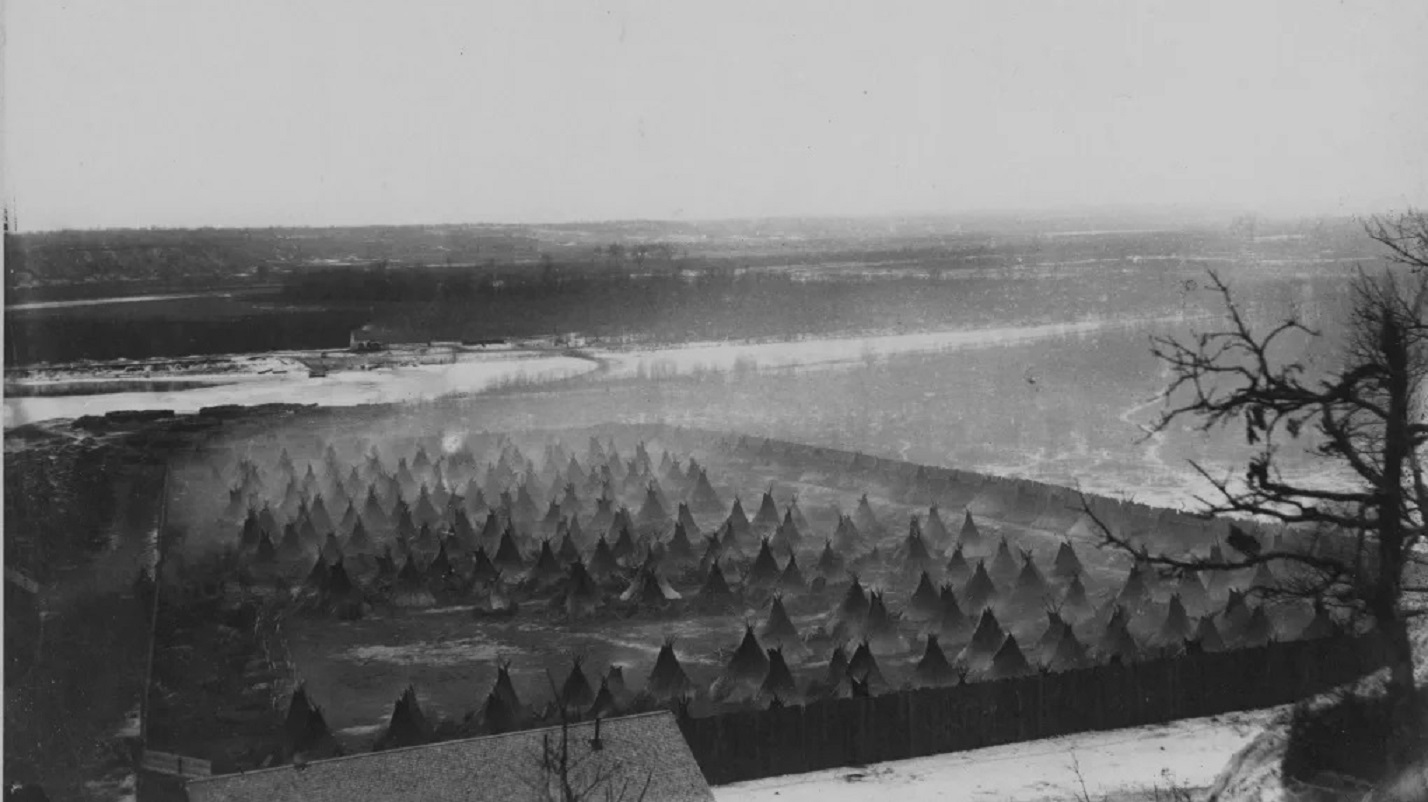
Concentration camp at Bdote, c. 1862

While Bdote is the origin story of the Dakota people, it is also the site of their forced exile from Minnesota. The Fort Snelling Dakota concentration camp at Bdote was a temporary holding facility for Dakota women, children, and elders who surrendered to the U.S. military after the Dakota War of 1862. The camp was on the banks of the Minnesota River, near the fort. It was established in November 1862 and held about 1,700 Dakota people. The conditions in the camp were miserable, and between 130 and 300 Dakota people died from disease and malnutrition. Dakota leader Gabriel Renville wrote: "We were so crowded and confined that an epidemic broke out among us and children were dying day and night. Amid all this sickness and these great tribulations, it seemed doubtful at night whether a person would be alive in the morning".

In December 1862, the U.S. military built a wooden stockade around the camp. The stockade was about 12 feet high and enclosed an area of two or three acres. The Dakota people were forced to live inside the stockade and not allowed to leave. The camp was guarded by soldiers from the Sixth, Seventh, and Tenth Minnesota Volunteer Infantry Regiments. The soldiers were responsible for controlling movement in and out of the camp.

Episcopalian Bishop Henry Benjamin Whipple advocated for the imprisoned Dakota people, and Reverend John Poage Williamson, who lived among the Dakota his whole life, joined them in the ordeal and remained with them as they were exiled into South Dakota. The concentration camp at Fort Snelling closed in May 1863 and the Dakota people who survived the camp were then exiled from Minnesota to the Crow Creek Reservation in South Dakota.

== Restoration attempts ==
There has recently been a growing movement to recognize and protect Bdote and the sites it encompasses as a sacred place. The Minnesota Humanities Center launched the Bdote Memory Map, an interactive online map that tells the story of Bdote from a Dakota perspective.

In 2019, 44 Minnesota House Democrats sent the Minnesota Historical Society a letter in support of adding Bdote to signage at Historic Fort Snelling. In 2021, Henry Sibley High School in Mendota Heights was renamed Two Rivers High School due to its proximity to Bdote. The school's former namesake, Henry Hastings Sibley, played a major role in the Dakota War of 1862 and the mass hanging of 38 Dakota men.

In 2021, Oglala Lakota chef Sean Sherman opened the restaurant Owamni at the site of Owámniyomni (Saint Anthony Falls); it serves dishes made only with ingredients indigenous to the Americas. Partnering with Sherman, the Minneapolis Park and Recreation Board and Parks Foundation raised money to open the restaurant in order to honor the Dakota heritage of the falls. It won Best New Restaurant at the 2022 James Beard Awards.

=== Fort Snelling redesign ===
An attempt to add "at Bdote" to the signage at Fort Snelling failed in 2019 after Republican lawmakers attempted to revoke $4 million in funding for the Minnesota Historical Society (MHS), which manages the Fort Snelling territory. The MHS board unanimously voted to continue with the current site name, citing no conclusive evidence to support renaming it from their research in the community. Native leaders and communities condemned the decision to withdraw engagement in the restoration of the Dakota name for the area.

In the 2016 legislative session, the MHS sought $34 million in bonding to redesign and restore the fort and territory. This included remodeling a barracks into a visitor center, tearing down the existing center, and building an amphitheater. Included in the project plan and budget was funding for renewed marketing, historical research, exhibit redesign, and community outreach and engagement, particularly with local Native communities and leaders. The MHS formed the Dakota Community Council in 2017 as part of its engagement effort.

=== Wakaŋ Tipi site reclamation ===
The Wakan Tipi Awanyankapi ("those who care for Wakan Tipi", formerly known as the Lower Phalen Creek project) is a Dakota-led organization that advocates for the restoration of native habitat and Indigenous histories to the Bruce Vento Nature Sanctuary and surrounding areas. They are building the Wakan Tipi Center at the sanctuary, which will be an immersive way to learn Dakota history, lifeways, language, and values. WTA and the City of St. Paul announced a co-management agreement for the site in 2024. Other goals include restoring Phalen Creek above ground and renaming Carver's Cave to the original Dakota name of Wakan Tipi.

=== Owámniyomni site reclamation ===
The Owámniyomni Okhódayapi ("Friends of the Falls") is a Dakota-led organization that is working to restore the falls to a natural state and return Dakota leadership to the management of the site. It is working with the city of Minneapolis for transfer of land surrounding the Upper Lock and Dam from the federal government (U.S. Army Corps of Engineers). The Army Corps of Engineers was expected to make a decision on the land transfer in 2024. In 2025, Owámniyomni Okhódayapi signed a 25-year lease for 5 acres of federal land adjacent to the Minneapolis downtown river parks. There is a plan to restore the site with native plants, re-creation of a 25-foot water cascade, restoration of limestone bluffs and ADA-accessible pathways. Construction will remove the second level of the former U.S. Army Corps of Engineers visitor center building and the Upper Lock parking lot. The restoration will occur over a phased timeline, with phase one focused on the land and plant elements in 2026. Phase two, which will focus on water and shoreline restoration, is planned for 2027-2028.

== See also ==
- History of Minnesota
