= Siseebakwet Lake =

Lake in the state of Minnesota, United States

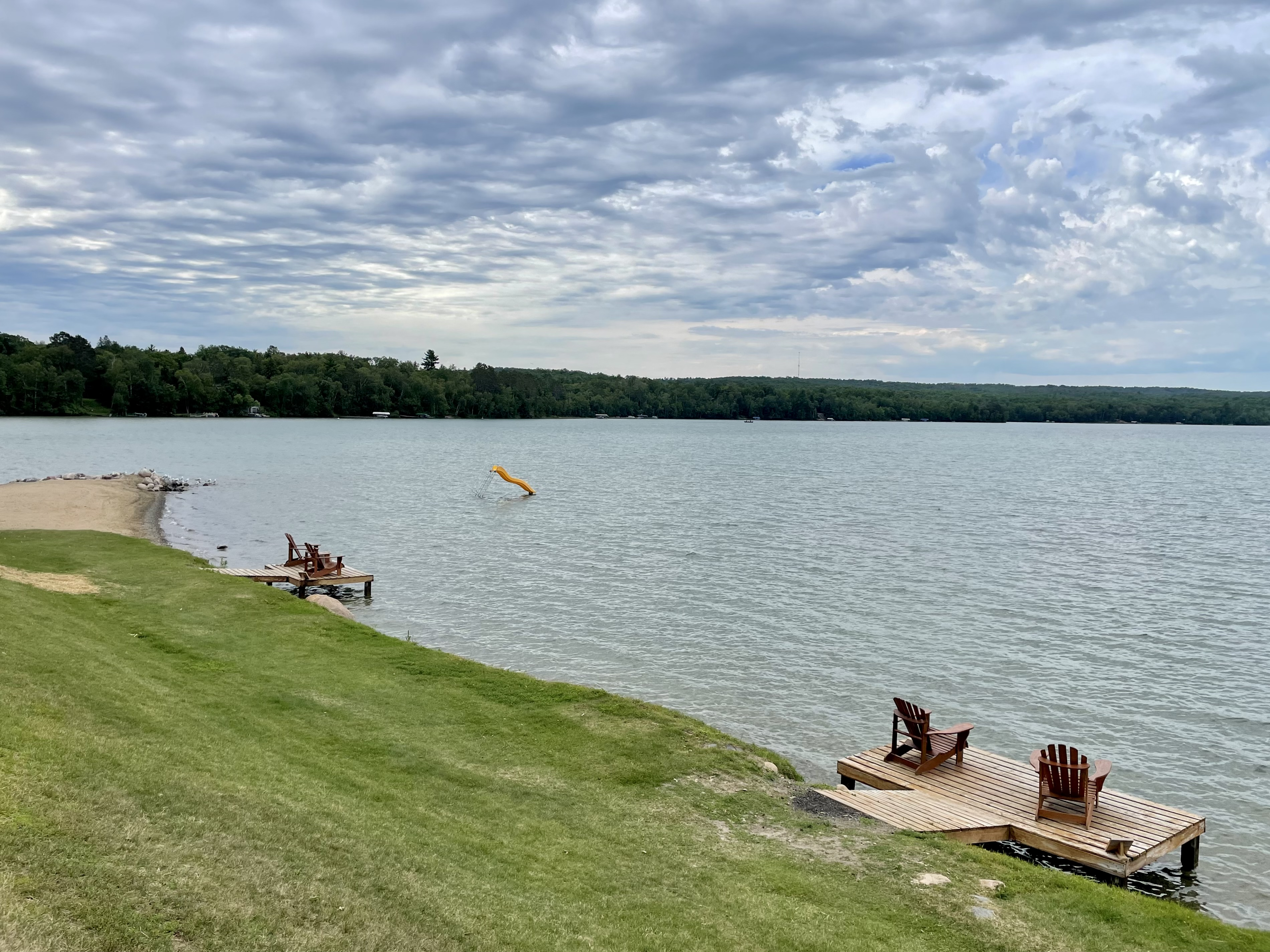

- Location within Minnesota
- Location: Itasca County, Minnesota
- Coordinates: 47°9′25″N 93°40′16″W
- Type: lake

Siseebakwet Lake is a lake in Itasca County, in the U.S. state of Minnesota.

Siseebakwet is a name derived from the Ojibwe language meaning "sugar".

== See also ==
- List of lakes in Minnesota
