= Pike Island =

River island in Minnesota, United States

Coordinates: 44°53′32″N 93°09′55″W

- Wita Tanka
- IUCN category III (natural monument or feature)
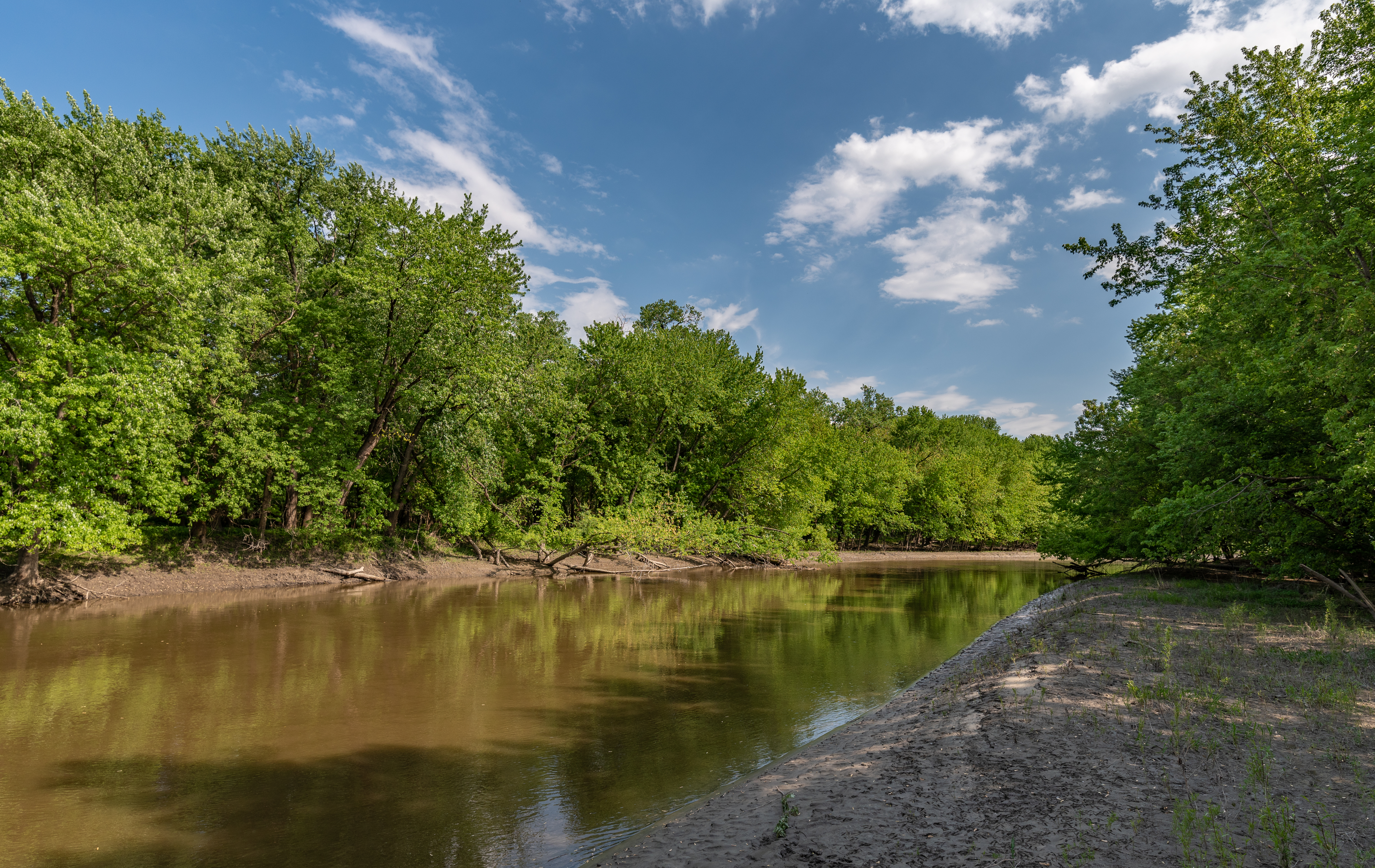
- Pike Island, 2018
- Location: Saint Paul, Minnesota, United States
- Area: 210 acres (85 ha)
- Elevation: 699 ft (213 m)
- Designation: Fort Snelling State Park
- Named for: Zebulon Pike
- Governing body: Minnesota Department of Natural Resources
- Website: Fort Snelling State Park

Pike Island (Dakota: Wita Tanka) is an island at the confluence of the Mississippi and Minnesota rivers in the southwestern-most part of Saint Paul in the U.S. state of Minnesota. The island is managed as part of Fort Snelling State Park and is within the Mississippi National River and Recreation Area. For centuries, Dakota people have considered the area of the island to be a sacred place known as Bdóte, where they moved with the seasons to find food and resources. The island is named after Zebulon Pike, who negotiated the United States government purchase of the area from Mdewakanton Sioux in 1805.

== History ==
For centuries, Dakota people have considered the confluence area of the Mississippi and Minnesota rivers to be a sacred place, Bdóte, which means “where two waters come together”. The two bluffs area was considered their place of creation, where the Earth gave rise to the first Dakota man and woman.

In September 1805, the island was part of a 100,000-acre (400 km^{2}) land purchased from the Mdewakanton Sioux by Zebulon Pike. Pike's Purchase was later to become Fort Snelling, Minneapolis, and Saint Paul. The U.S. government wanted to build a fort to protect American interests in the fur trade in the region, and Pike negotiated the treaty. Pike valued the land at $200,000, but the U.S. Senate later agreed to pay only $2,000.

In 1819 Colonel Henry Leavenworth invited Jean-Baptiste Faribault, a French Canadian, and his family to settle on Pike Island near the new fort to help promote the fur trade. An 1820 treaty gave ownership of Pike Island to Elizabeth Pelagie Fairibault, a Dakota, and wife of Jean-Baptiste Faribault.

The six-week Dakota War of 1862 resulted in the deaths of hundreds of settlers and Native Americans. After the conflict, more than 400 Dakotas were tried, and 302 men condemned to be executed at Mankato, Minnesota. President Lincoln eventually commuted the sentences of all but 38 Dakota, who were hanged in a mass execution on December 26, 1862.

During this time more than 1600 Dakota women, children, and old men were held in an internment camp on Pike Island under the cannons of Fort Snelling. Winter living conditions were harsh, with little food and no shelter. Cholera struck the camp, killing more than three hundred. In May 1863, the survivors were forced aboard steamboats and relocated to Crow Creek in the southeastern Dakota Territory, a place stricken by drought at the time. The survivors of Crow Creek were moved three years later to the Santee Sioux Reservation in Nebraska.

== Recreation ==
Pike Island is part of Fort Snelling State Park and is within the Mississippi National River and Recreation Area. The Pike Island hiking trail is a 3.7-mile (6.0 km), natural surface loop that follows the exterior of the island to the confluence of the Minnesota and Mississippi rivers and reaches a sandy beachhead. In winter, snow pack on the trail is groomed for classic cross-country skiing. Several dirt trails from the main trail reach the banks of the two rivers allowing access for fishing.

== Gallery ==
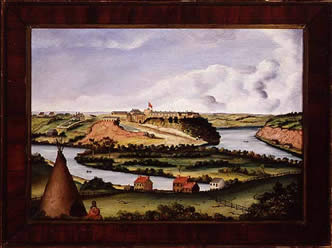
Fort Snelling and Pike Island, 1850

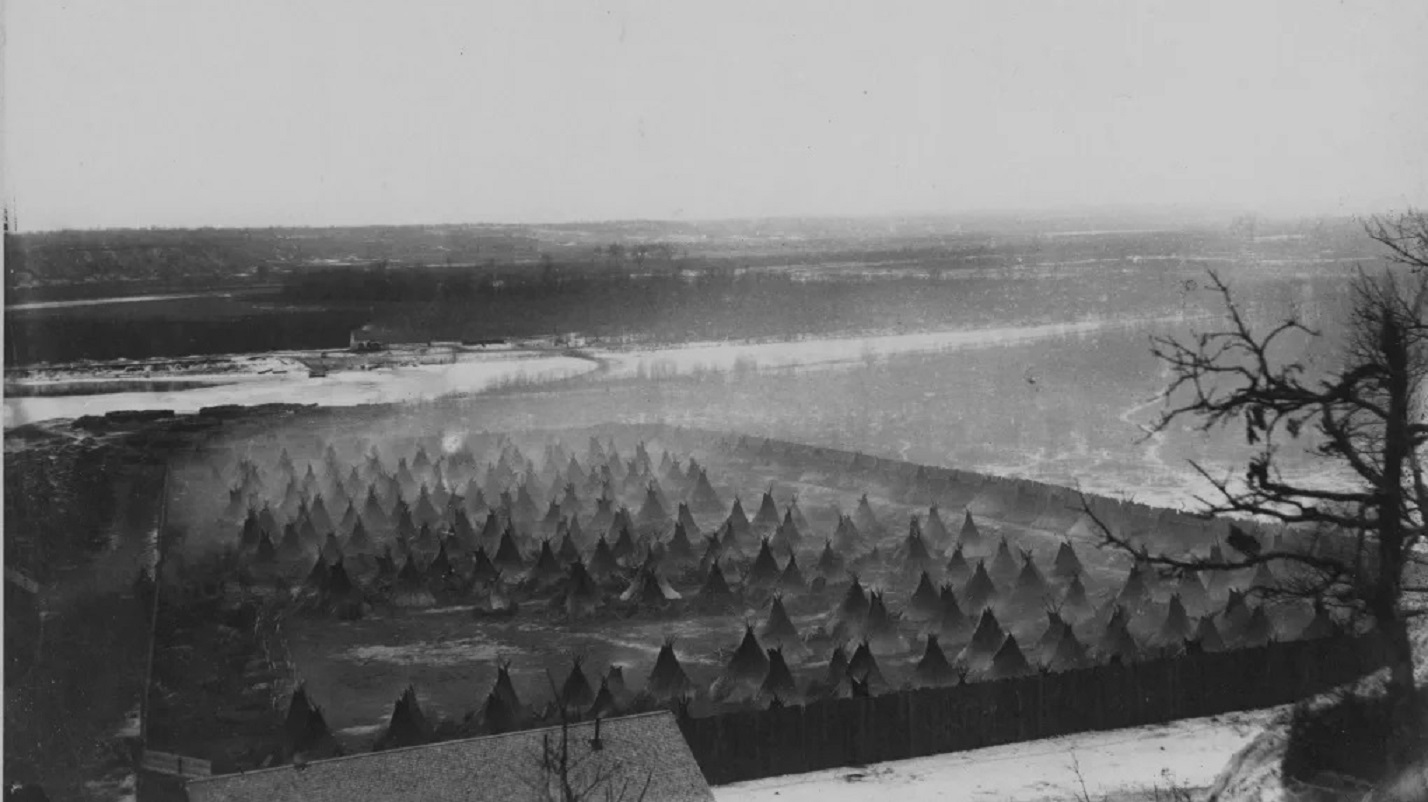
Dakota Internment Camp, 1862
