= Culture of Minnesota =

The culture of Minnesota is a subculture of the United States with influences from Scandinavian Americans, Finnish Americans, Irish Americans, German Americans, Native Americans, and Czechoslovak Americans, among numerous other immigrant groups.

== People ==
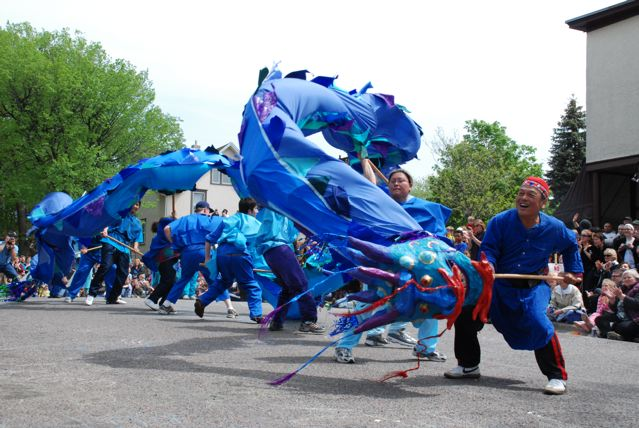
In the Heart of the Beast Puppet and Mask Theatre May Day Parade, Minneapolis

Stereotypical Minnesotan traits include manners known as Minnesota nice with very strong family ties and a sense of community exclusive to those with shared beliefs. Potlucks, usually with a variety of hotdishes, are popular at community functions, especially church activities. Movies such as Fargo, Grumpy Old Men, and Drop Dead Gorgeous, the TV series Fargo (loosely inspired by the film), the radio show A Prairie Home Companion, and the book How to Talk Minnesotan deliberately exaggerate and satirize Minnesota culture, speech, and mannerisms.

== Cuisine ==
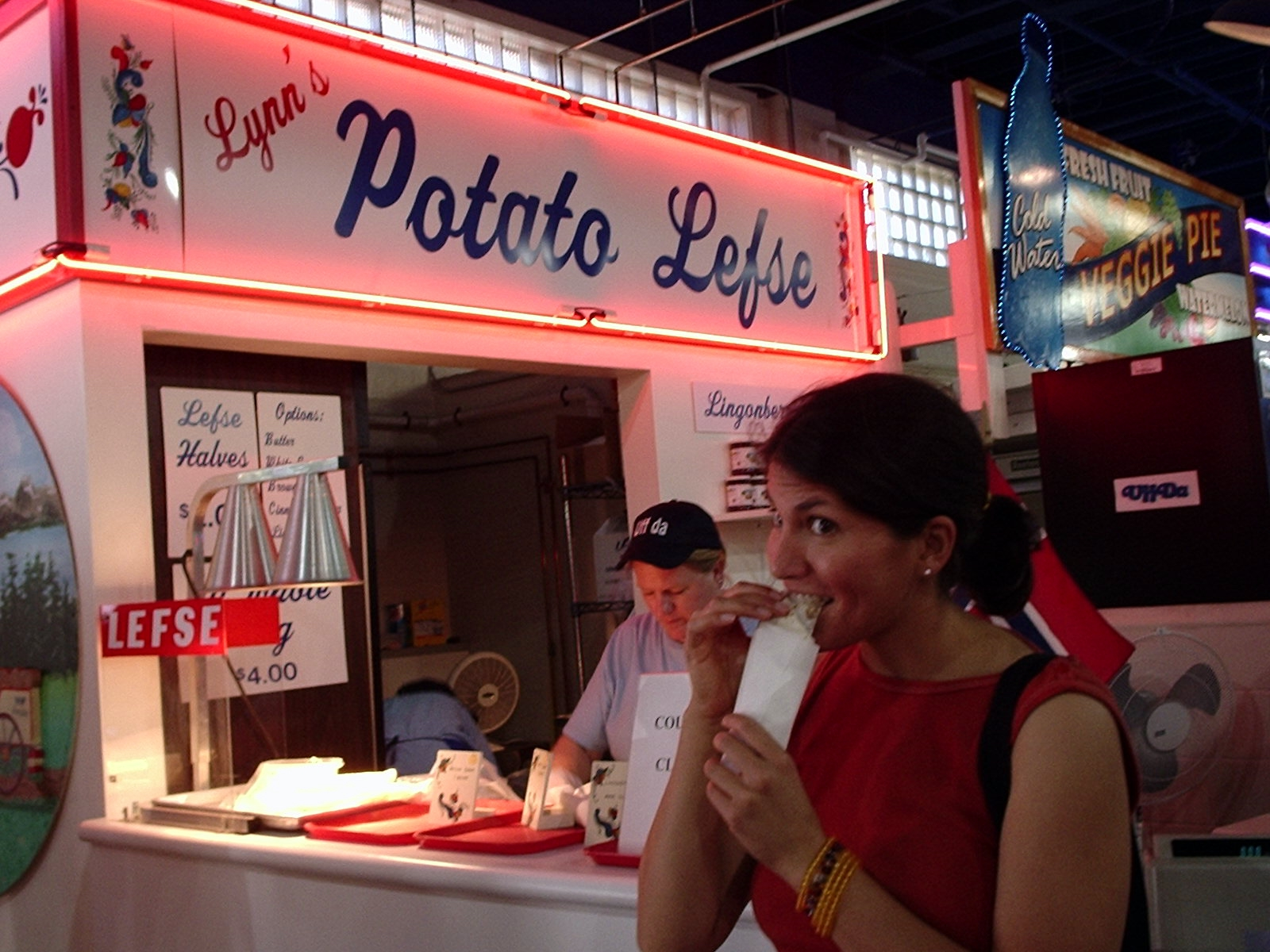
Lefse at the Minnesota State Fair

Some common wild Minnesota edibles include wild rice, blueberry, raspberry, blackberry, chokecherry, morels, and hazelnuts. A variety of fish, such as walleye, panfish, and trout are available in Minnesota's lakes, rivers, and streams. Many of these foods were long staples of Native communities before the Industrial Revolution and white settlement in the region. The Ojibwe, for example, consider wild rice not only an important foodstuff but an "object of veneration, and an important ingredient of social and ceremonial life."

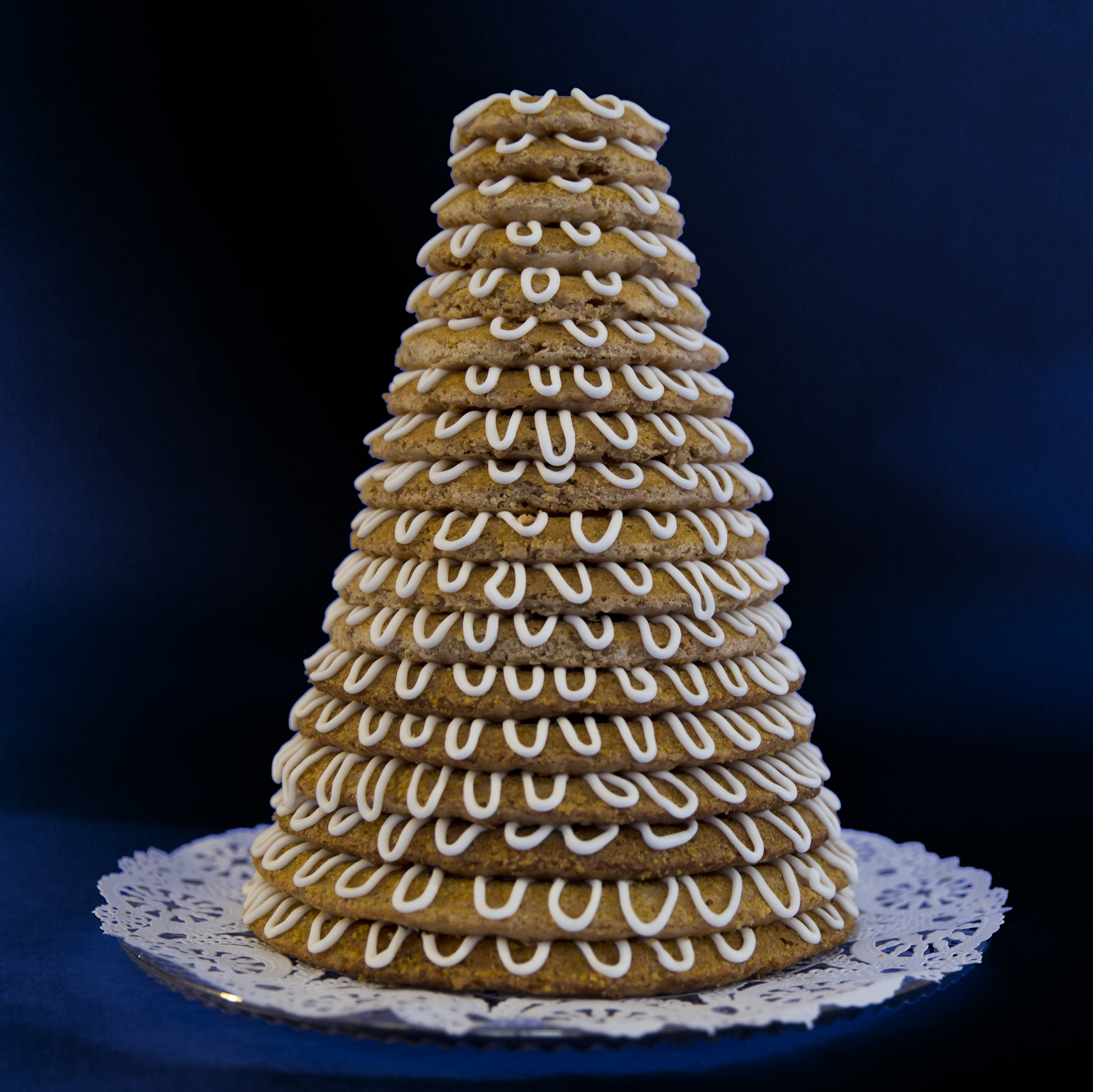
18 layer kransekake

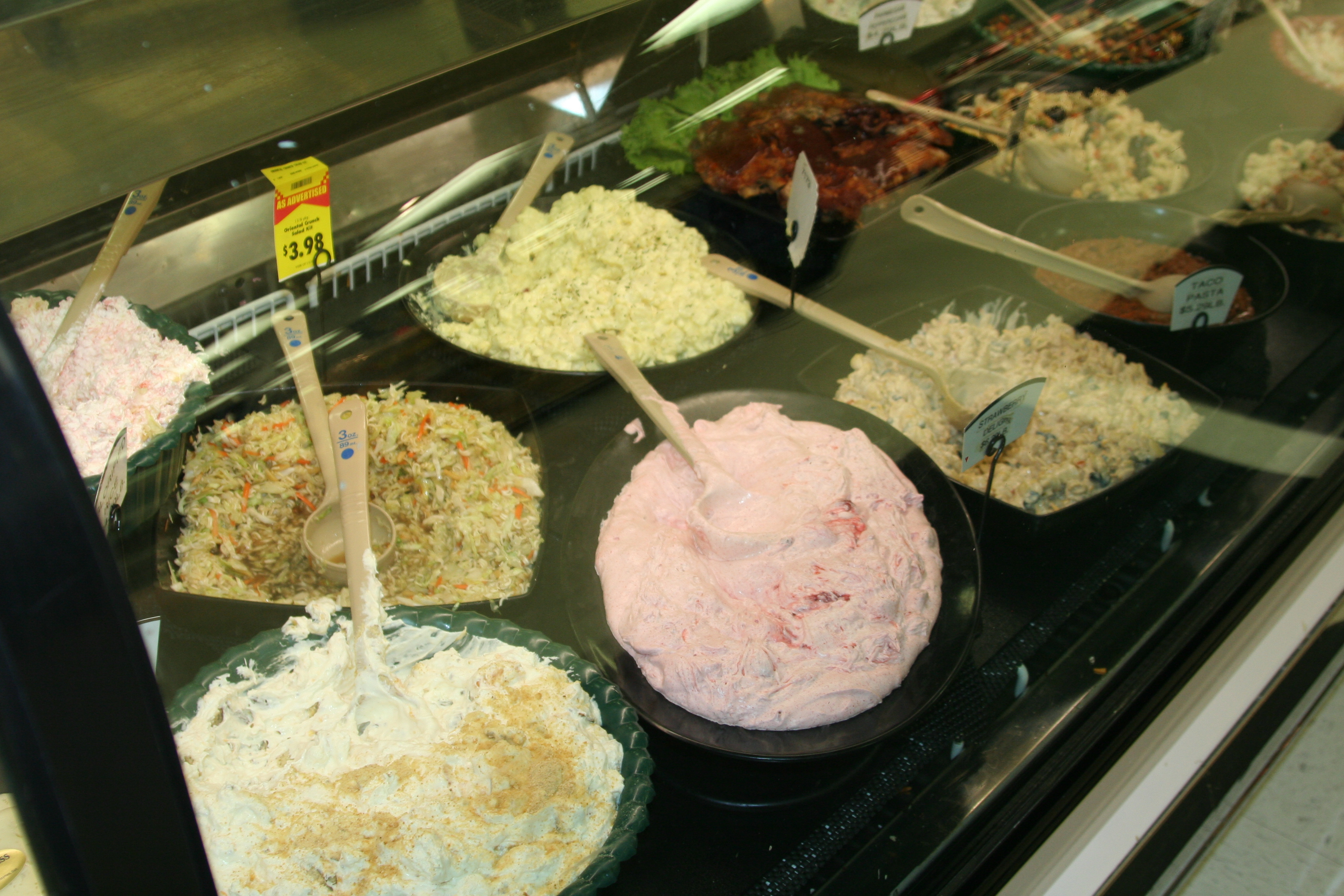
Various salads, including dessert salads, potato salads and pasta salads are popular in Minnesota

With an increased immigration from abroad, Minnesota's culture appropriated traditions from Scandinavian, German, and Slavic heritages. In areas settled by Scandinavian immigrants, such as the countryside around Northfield, Moorhead, and much of the state's northern part, traditional cuisine such as lefse, lutefisk, rosettes, gravlax, krumkake, kransekake, and lingonberries are popular.

Due in large part to the public radio program A Prairie Home Companion, hosted by Minnesota native Garrison Keillor, Minnesotans are generally stereotyped as being of Scandinavian descent. In reality, German-Americans are by far the state's largest ethnic group. During early settlement, Minnesota's German-Americans were divided between secular Forty-Eighters and religiously active Germans, who included Roman Catholics, Lutherans, Jews, Mennonites, and Amish. But like their compatriots throughout the United States, Minnesota's German-Americans overwhelmingly chose to assimilate in response to persecution during World War I and, later, horror and shame over Nazi war crimes. In historically German-speaking parts of the state such as the farming country surrounding St. Cloud and New Ulm, marzipan, lebkuchen, gingerbread, stollen, Shoofly pies, potato pancakes, Spätzle, bratwursts, and sauerkraut remain popular.

In the regions settled by Polish, Czech, Slovenian, Rusyn, and other Slavic immigrants, such as the farming country surrounding St. Stephen, Little Falls, Browerville, Holdingford, New Prague, and the Mesabi Iron Range, parties with smorgasbord-style tables filled with kolaches, potica, halušky and pierogis are still held.

Even in communities with too small a Greek-American population to host a parish or mission of the Greek Orthodox Church, restaurants serving gyros, baklava, and spanakopita are popular.

In parts of the state with historically large Italian-American communities such as the Twin Cities and the Mesabi Iron Range, Italian cuisine is popular.

Due to the historically large Cornish-American community in the Mesabi Iron Range, the pasty remains popular there and has been adapted to the cuisine of other local ethnic groups.

In parts of Minnesota with a historically large Ashkenazi Jewish population such as the Twin Cities, Duluth, St. Cloud, and the Mesabi Iron Range, traditional foods like latkes and hamantashen remain popular on the High Holy Days. After the passage of the Jackson-Vanik Amendment, the Minneapolis suburb of St. Louis Park had a large influx of Soviet Jews, who brought their own culinary traditions to Minnesota. The 1979 overthrow of the Last Shah also brought a large influx of Iranian Jews to the Twin Cities.

Since the Iranian Revolution of 1979, many non-Jewish Iranian-Americans have also brought their culinary traditions to Minnesota.

The aftermath of the Vietnam War brought Vietnamese-American, Laotian-American, Hmong-American, and Cambodian-American refugees and their culinary traditions to Minnesota.

Minnesota is also known for what is called "hotdish", a type of casserole; "jello salads"; the "Jucy Lucy", a burger with melted cheese in the patty; South Minneapolis vanilla ice cream; wild rice soup; Cornish pasties; corn dogs; Minneapolis-style pizza; dessert bars; Bundt cakes; Minneapolis-style hotdog; deep-fried cheese curds; and walleye fingers.

The relatively short growing season demanded agricultural innovation. The Minnesota Agricultural Experiment Station's Horticultural Research Center at the University of Minnesota has developed three new apple varieties, the Haralson, Honeycrisp, and the Sweetango. These fare well in the harsh Minnesota climate and are popular fruit.

At the Minnesota State Fair dozens of foods are offered "on a stick", such as Pronto Pups and deep-fried candy bars. Though not typical Minnesota cuisine, these are archetypal fair foods. Minnesota is also home to several breweries, including Hamm's, Summit Brewing Company, Surly Brewing Company, and August Schell Brewing Company, which also produces Grain Belt.

=== Potlucks ===
Minnesota is known for its church potlucks, where hotdish is often served. Hotdish is any of a variety of casseroles, which are popular throughout the United States, although the term "hotdish" is used mainly in Minnesota, Wisconsin, North Dakota, and South Dakota. Hotdishes are filling comfort foods that are convenient and easy to make. Tater tot hotdish is popular, as is wild rice hotdish; Minnesota is one of the leading producers of wild rice. Dessert bars are also common at Minnesota potlucks. Other dishes include glorified rice, German baked apples and cookie salad.

== Sports and recreation ==
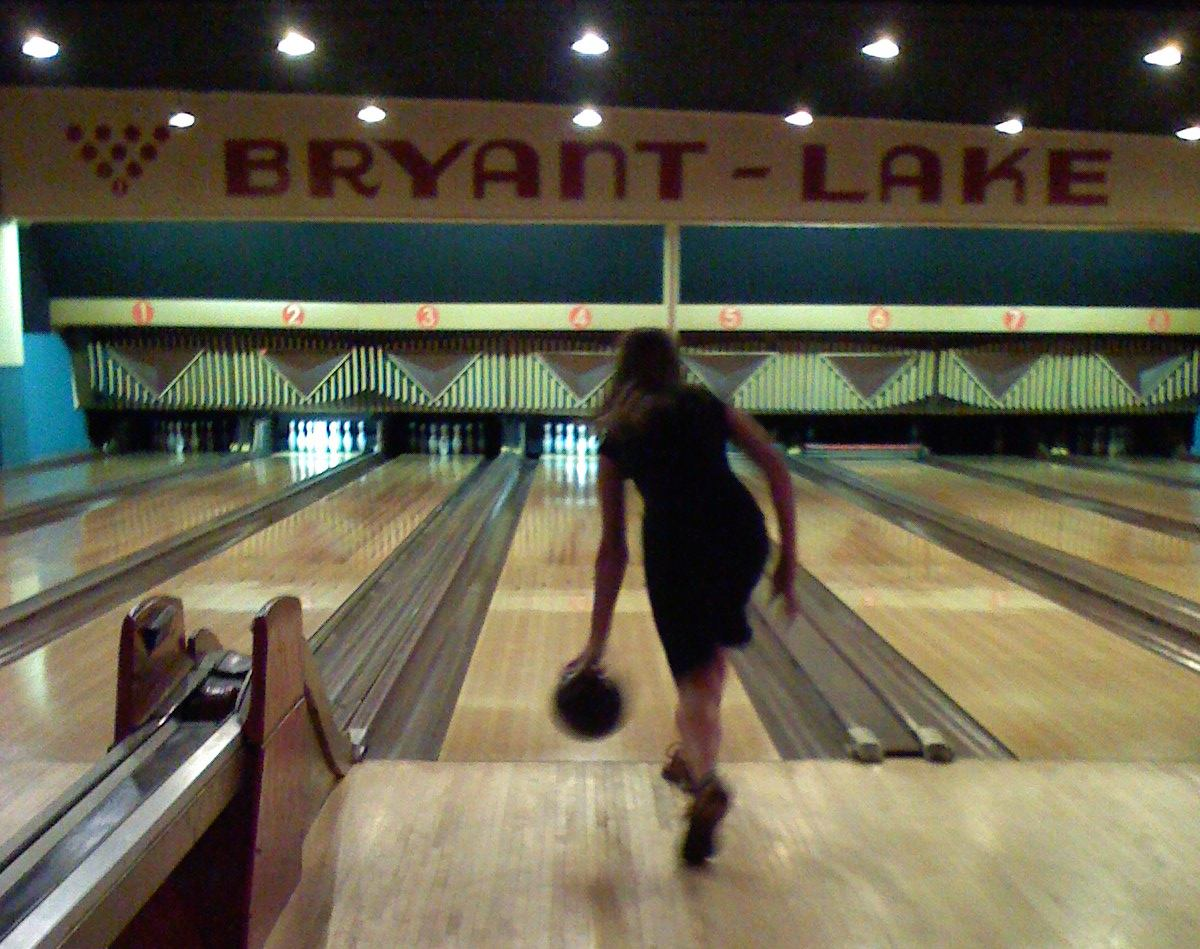
Bowling, Bryant-Lake Bowl, Minneapolis

Sports in Minnesota include professional teams in all major sports, Olympic Games contenders and medalists, especially in the Winter Olympics, collegiate teams in major and small-school conferences and associations, and active amateur teams and individual sports. The state has a team in all four major professional leagues (MLB, NFL, NBA, and NHL) and the University of Minnesota is one of the founding members of the Big Ten.

In the Twin Cities, which has always had a large Irish-American community, the Gaelic Athletic Association has a club named after Irish republican icon Robert Emmett. The club fields hurling, camogie, and Gaelic football teams. On August 2, 2019, the women of the Robert Emmets Hurling Club's Camogie team won the Silver Cup at the 2019 Gaelic Athletic Association World Games at Croke Park in Dublin.

Natives and tourists enjoy a variety of outdoor activities in Minnesota's warm summers, though it is mostly known for its winters. The state has produced curlers and skiers who have competed in the Winter Olympics, pioneers who invented the snowmobile, Rollerblades, water skiing and legions of ice fishing enthusiasts. It is also known for enthusiastic ice hockey players, both at the amateur and professional levels. Eveleth, Minnesota, home to the United States Hockey Hall of Fame, boasts of the city's and the rest of the Mesabi Range's contributions to the growth and development of hockey in the United States. The abundant indoor and outdoor ice rinks provide ample opportunity to learn and practice several winter sports.

Minnesota's more than 10,000 lakes play an important role in the state's recreation patterns. It has the most per-capita boat registrations of any state.

Children in Minnesota play the game Duck Duck Gray Duck, in contrast to other American states, where "Duck Duck Goose" is played instead. In "Duck Duck Gray Duck", all ducks are given a color, often "Grrrrr-eeen Duck".

== Literature ==
In a 2021 interview with the St. Cloud Times, Sauk Rapids resident Tracy Rittmueller, the founder of the Lyricality poets and writers organization, said, "We have literally one of the best literary cultures in the United States. It's, as far as I'm concerned, as good as New York, as good as California. We don't get the national press because we're in that flyover zone... They're just not paying attention. So I felt it was our job in Minnesota to pay attention."

=== Native American writers ===
William Whipple Warren, who was born in 1825 in La Pointe, Wisconsin, into a family of mixed Lake Superior Ojibwe, French Canadian, and White Anglo-Saxon Protestant descent, moved in 1845 to the drunken and hedonistic boom town of Old Crow Wing, Minnesota, where he worked as an interpreter for fur trader Henry Mower Rice. Bilingual and educated in the manner of America's elite, Warren collected stories from the oral tradition of the Ojibwe people to tell their story before and after their first encounter with voyageurs from New France, which Warren carefully compared against documents from French, British, and American sources. After having suffered from tuberculosis for many years, Warren died at age 28 on June 1, 1853, and was buried in Saint Paul. The Minnesota Historical Society published his unfinished history in 1885.

Charles Eastman, who was born in 1858 into a family of the Santee Dakota people in a tepee near Redwood Falls, Minnesota, published many literary works about the history, culture and folklore of the Dakota. He is considered one of the first Native American authors to write about American history from a Native perspective.

Anton Treuer's 2011 book The Assassination of Hole in the Day tells the story, based on government documents, old newspapers, and the oral history of the Ojibwe people, of the life of Chief Hole in the Day and his ambush and murder by members of the Pillager Band of Ojibwe on a road near Gull Lake, Minnesota, on June 27, 1868. On the day of his death, Hole in the Day had left his home in a horse and buggy and was on the way to Washington, D.C. to renegotiate the treaty regarding the Ojibwe's planned migration to the new White Earth Reservation. In the meantime, he had issued orders that no Ojibwe people were to move to White Earth until the federal government actually built everything on the reservation that it had promised in the previous treaty. The chief's murder was national news, but for decades, the reasons for it remained a mystery. The names of the assassins were known, but no one was ever charged. In 1911, the surviving assassins testified that they had been hired by a group of mobbed-up Métis (mixed-race) businessmen and illegal whiskey peddlers led by Clement Hudon Beaulieu, the Democratic Party's political boss of the region that surrounded Old Crow Wing, Minnesota. The reason was the chief's recent vow to "use the knife's edge" to keep certain "mixed-bloods" off the new White Earth Reservation and to have them cease to receive tribal annuity payments from the federal government. While negotiating with a previous group of hired gunmen, who had demanded half their money in advance, Beaulieu had said that Hole in the Day was like a great big log and, if he was not killed, it would be impossible for Beaulieu and his confederates to get past him. According to Treuer, the assassins risked the vengeance of Hole in the Day's relatives and testified about the murder because they had come to regret their actions. Beaulieu and his confederates had kept none of the lavish promises they had made to their hired gunmen. Furthermore, Beaulieu, the other conspirators, and their families had also taken control of the government, law enforcement, and business community of the White Earth Reservation and enriched themselves by defrauding and impoverishing everyone else. Their hired assassins had grown aware, not only of Hole in the Day's ability to force the federal bureaucracy to keep its promises to the Ojibwe people, but also of the chief's ability to keep Clement Beaulieu and his confederates in check. For these reasons, all the chief's murderers had come to mourn his absence. Treuer describes the chief's assassination as a watershed moment in the history of the Ojibwe people and argues that the aftermath of his murder was a major factor in the continuing collapse of their language and culture.

Louise Erdrich is a Native American author of novels, poetry, and children's books featuring Native American characters and settings. She is an enrolled citizen of the Turtle Mountain Band of Chippewa Indians of North Dakota. Erdrich is widely acclaimed as one of the most significant writers of the second wave of the Native American Renaissance. She has written 28 books in all, including fiction, nonfiction, poetry, and children's books. Among other awards, Erdrich was awarded the 2012 National Book Award for Fiction for her novel The Round House and the 2021 Pulitzer Prize for Fiction for her novel The Night Watchman. She owns Birchbark Books, a small independent bookstore in Minneapolis that focuses on Native American literature and the Native community in the Twin Cities.

=== Poetry ===
Since the early days of settlement, Minnesota has been home to poets who wrote in English and every other language spoken by the many immigrant groups who settled in the state. The best-known English-language poets from Minnesota are Oscar C. Eliason, Robert Bly, Gregory Corso, Siri Hustvedt, and Thomas M. Disch. The state Poet Laureate was Joyce Sutphen, who grew up in St. Joseph and teaches at Gustavus Adolphus College in St. Peter. The current state Poet Laureate is Gwen Westerman, who teaches at Minnesota State University, Mankato.

Although Henry Wadsworth Longfellow never visited Minnesota, his poem The Song of Hiawatha is set there and is based on Ojibwe and Ottawa legends collected and published by Henry Rowe Schoolcraft, on Mary Henderson Eastman's 1849 book Dahcotah, or Life and Legends of the Sioux Around Fort Snelling, and on an 1855 photograph of Minnehaha Falls by Alexander Hessler. The epic tells the story of Hiawatha, a warrior from the Lake Superior Ojibwe, and his star-crossed love affair with Minnehaha, a Dakota woman. Longfellow's hero is based heavily upon the Ojibwe legends surrounding the trickster spirit Nanabozho and also contains Longfellow's own innovations.

Some locations, such as Lake Nokomis, are named in honor of the poem. The Dakota people called the falls "Minnehaha", which means simply waterfall, long before the construction of Fort Snelling, and Longfellow named Hiawatha's wife in honor of the falls and set romantic scenes between them there. For this reason, Minnehaha Falls remains a very popular tourist site.

In Minnesota folklore, the ghost of Confessional poet John Berryman, who killed himself on January 7, 1972, by jumping from the Washington Avenue Bridge in Minneapolis onto the west bank of the Mississippi River, is said to be seen sitting on the railing of that bridge.

German poetry written in Minnesota was often featured in the many German-language newspapers formerly published in the state. For example, during the early years of settlement in Stearns County by German-speaking Catholic "peasant-pioneers", the valley made by the North Fork of the Watab River was named Schönthal ("beautiful valley"). According to local historian Coleman J. Barry, the Watab Valley's beauty inspired many works of locally composed German poetry. Furthermore, on July 18, 1863, Die Minnesota-Staats-Zeitung, a newspaper published by and for German-speaking Forty-Eighters in the state, printed An die Helden des Ersten Minnesota Regiments ("To the Heroes of the First Minnesota Regiment"), a poetic tribute to the Union soldiers of the 1st Minnesota Infantry Regiment and their charge from Cemetery Ridge during the second day of the Battle of Gettysburg. The poet was G. A. Erdman of Hastings, Minnesota. Another important Minnesota poet who wrote in German was Rose Ausländer, a Jewish immigrant from the Austro-Hungarian Empire and future survivor of the Holocaust in Romania. While living in Minneapolis during the aftermath of World War I, Ausländer worked as an editor for the German-language newspaper Westlicher Herold and collaborated on the anthology Amerika-Herold-Kalender, in which she published her first poems.

While serving as a Roman Catholic missionary to the Ojibwe and local Irish and German-American pioneers, Francis Xavier Pierz wrote many works of Slovenian poetry about his experiences.

Hieronim Derdowski, a major figure in Polish poetry, emigrated to the United States from Toruń in Prussian Poland, and settled in Winona, Minnesota, where he died and was buried in 1902. Poems were written and published in both English and Polish by Victoria Janda, who was born in Nowy Targ, Austria-Hungary in 1888 and died in Minneapolis in 1961.

Among Blue Earth County's Welsh-American pioneers, the most highly regarded figures in local Welsh poetry were James D. Price, whose Bardic name was "Ap Dewi", Ellis E. Ellis, whose Bardic name was "Glan Dyfi", Edward Thomas, whose Bardic name was "Awenydd", and John I. Davis, whose Bardic name was "Ioan Idris".

According to a memoir by D.M. Jones, Price (Ap Dewi) was so highly regarded by his compatriots in the state that he was urged to act as Prifardd, or "Chief Bard", of Minnesota. Also according to Jones, during the late 19th century a group of Welsh-language Bards regularly met under Ellis's leadership at the Cheshire and Jones Shop in Mankato, where the packing paper in the shop was often used to write down englynion in Welsh.

In 2016, award-winning memoirist Kao Kalia Yang, who was born in Ban Vinai Refugee Camp in Thailand and grew up in St. Paul, published The Song Poet, a biography of her father, Bee Yang, a well-known poet in the Hmong language, cultural critic, and highly respected figure in the Hmong-American community in and around the Twin Cities.

In the Twin Cities and other communities such as St. Cloud that are home to large Somali-American communities, the composition of Somali poetry in traditional verse forms remains a large part of Somali culture in Minnesota. By 2017, some younger poets from the community had begun adapting traditional Somali verse forms to the rhythms of American English and composing poems about their experiences as immigrants.

==== Eisteddfodau ====
After the Treaty of Traverse des Sioux in 1851, Welsh immigrants settled much of what is now Blue Earth County. The first Welsh literary society in Minnesota was founded, according to Price, at a meeting in South Bend Township in 1855. Price wrote, "The first eisteddfod in the state of Minnesota was held in Judson in the house of Wm. C. Williams in 1864. The second eisteddfod was held in Judson in the log chapel in 1866 with the Rev. John Roberts as chairman. Ellis E. Ellis, Robert E. Hughes, H.H. Hughes, Rev. J. Jenkins, and William R. Jones took part in this eisteddfod. The third eisteddfod was held in Judson in the new chapel (Jerusalem) on January 2, 1871. The famous Llew Llwyfo (bardic name) was chairman and a splendid time was had."

According to the Mankato Free Press, the custom of local Eisteddfodau went into abeyance during the 1950s. The Blue Earth County Historical Society and the League of Minnesota Poets made an effort to revive the tradition by in the early 21st century. During the 2006 Eisteddfod at the Morgan Creek Vineyards in New Ulm, adjudicator John Calvin Rezmerski awarded Brainerd poet Doris Stengel the Bardic Chair. After Rezmerski's death in 2016, the custom of local Eisteddfodau again fell into abeyance.

==== League of Minnesota Poets ====
On February 10, 1934, 33 Minnesota poets met at the Lowry Hotel in St. Paul and became the charter members of the newly formed League of Minnesota Poets. Marie d’Autremont Gerry became the league's first president. Three meetings were held annually. By year's end, there were 74 members.

The first two books the League published that year are Maude Schilplin's Anthology of Minnesota Verse and Clara Clausen's Steps in Creative Poetry. These early members endeavored "to make Minnesota poetry conscious, and conscious to its own poets."

=== Nonfiction ===
- William Furlan's 1952 book In Charity Unfeigned: The Life of Father Francis X. Pierz describes how Francis Xavier Pierz, a Roman Catholic priest, missionary, and poet from Kamnik, in modern Slovenia, worked as a missionary to the Ojibwe people in the frontier Territory of Minnesota and convinced large numbers of Catholic immigrants from Germany and Slovenia to settle in what is now Central Minnesota. Furlan also describes Pierz's role in nonviolently defusing Chief Hole in the Day's 1862 efforts to stage an Ojibwe uprising, which saved many lives on both sides. Pierz remains a folk hero in Minnesota folklore.
- James Patrick Shannon's 1957 book Catholic Colonization on the Western Frontier describes the efforts of Archbishop John Ireland to settle families of Irish Catholic immigrants on farms on the Minnesota frontier. De Graff and Clontarf in Swift County, Adrian in Nobles County, Avoca, Iona and Fulda in Murray County, Graceville in Big Stone County and Ghent in Lyon County are all farming colonies that Archbishop Ireland established.
- Susan Berman's 1981 memoir Easy Street: The True Story of a Mob Family tells her story of growing up as the daughter of David Berman, an Ashkenazi Jewish immigrant from Odessa and major organized crime figure in both Minneapolis and Las Vegas. According to the memoir, David Berman ordered the murders of two Italian-American brothers whom Chicago Outfit acting boss Al Capone had sent to organize a Mafia family in the Twin Cities. The brothers' murders allegedly resulted in a sit-down between Capone and Berman's protectors in Meyer Lansky's crew of the Luciano crime family of New York City. Capone allegedly demanded Berman's assassination, which the New York City Jewish mobsters refused to permit. At the end of the sit-down, Capone grudgingly backed down, but vowed to have David Berman whacked if he ever visited Chicago. Berman and his crew violently attacked a Minneapolis rally of the Silver Shirts, a Fascist and anti-Semitic paramilitary group financed by Nazi Germany and modeled after Benito Mussolini's Blackshirts. During the attack, Berman allegedly assaulted Silver Shirts leader and founder William Dudley Pelley, alias "The Chief", as he gave a speech calling for "an end to every Jew bastard in the city". Also, immediately after the 1947 murder of senior Lansky associate Bugsy Siegel, David Berman and Moe Sedway took over the running of Siegel's casinos in Las Vegas. Since the 1981 publication of her memoir, Susan Berman has gained far greater notoriety than her father by becoming in 2000 one of the three alleged murder victims of real estate billionaire and suspected serial killer Robert Durst.
- Gary Clayton Anderson and Alan Woolworth's 1988 anthology Through Dakota Eyes: Narrative Accounts of the Minnesota Indian War of 1862 relates the history of the Dakota War of 1862 through the firsthand accounts of Dakota people, including those who experienced combat on both sides and those who, as part of a secret understanding with Minnesota State militia Colonel Henry Hastings Sibley, rode into and took control of Chief Little Crow's camp and rescued the surviving hostages during the Battle of Wood Lake.
- Jeffrey Taylor's 1994 book The Pru-Bache Murder: The Fast Life and Grisly Death of a Millionaire Stockbroker recounts the 1991 murder of Michael Prozumenshikov, a Soviet Jewish refugee and former Komsomol leader from Leningrad, had come to the United States under the Jackson-Vanik Amendment and had become a white collar criminal who viewed his clients as a means to support his lifestyle. After defrauding every one of his many friends and neighbors, Prozumenshikov had become a detested pariah among the otherwise close-knit Soviet Jewish community in St. Louis Park and the other western suburbs of Minneapolis. Following the discovery of his headless and dismembered body in 1991, other refugees who had known him assumed that Prozumshikov had gotten involved with the Russian Mafia and been murdered for defrauding them, too. To the shock of everyone who had known both, the St. Louis Park Police Department instead arrested and charged Zachary Persits, a previously law-abiding middle-class husband, father, and fellow Soviet Jewish refugee. As with all of his other clients, Prozumenshikov had promised to treat the Persits family's life savings as though it were his own money and then illegally boosted his commissions by putting their money in unsafe investments, which were wiped out by the 1987 stock market crash. This in turn prevented Persits's academically gifted son from being able to go to the elite private school by which he had been accepted. Despite a long history of psychological problems and his insistence that the murder was not premeditated, Persits was convicted of first degree murder and sentenced to life imprisonment.
- Since the 1995 publication of Paul Maccabee's John Dillinger Slept Here: A Crooks' Tour of Crime and Corruption in St. Paul, 1920–1936, which acts as a tour guide to the Twin Cities' criminal underworld of the 1920s and '30s, tour buses take customers to the sites described in the book. The book describes St. Paul's Irish-American and Democratic Party political machine, in which politicians behaved more like Godfathers than public servants and the St. Paul Police Department behaved more like a crime family than crime fighters. Maccabee begins with the 1928 murder by car bombing of St. Paul Irish mob boss Danny Hogan, allegedly on the orders of Jewish-American mob boss Harry Sawyer and ends with the defeat of the Dillinger and Barker Gangs, the convictions on kidnapping charges of both Sawyer and German-American mobster Jack Pilben, and the cleansing of the police department in 1936. Maccabee's book is also uses declassified FBI files and taped interviews to expose St. Paul Police Chief Thomas Archibald Brown as the mastermind behind many of the most outrageously violent crimes of the Public Enemies era. Maccabee conclusively implicates Brown for collusion with organized crime figures Sawyer, Pilben, and Leon Gleckman. He also outs Brown for repeatedly hiring both the Dillinger and Barker gangs to carry out multiple armed robberies and kidnappings in and around the Twin Cities. During a post office robbery committed on Brown's orders and with him promised a cut of the profits, the Barker Gang machine-gunned to death one South Saint Paul police officer, permanently crippled another, and then drove through downtown South St. Paul, firing their Thompson submachine guns at anyone and anything that moved. Maccabee writes that despite local FBI agents' obsession with getting Brown indicted and prosecuted, Brown's fellow cops were too terrified of being murdered to testify against him. All the FBI ever achieved was to cause Brown to lose his badge during a department review board hearing, after which he never again worked in law enforcement, but died a free man.
- Bridget Connelly's 2003 memoir Forgetting Ireland: Uncovering a Family's Secret History relates her experiences growing up in an Irish-American farming family in Graceville, Minnesota. Connelly also tells how she learned that her grandmother and her great-grandparents were Irish-speaking refugees from the Irish Famine of 1879 in Connemara and had been brought to Minnesota and settled on their farm by Archbishop John Ireland of the Roman Catholic Archdiocese of St. Paul and Minneapolis, who, in Graceville lore, "was worse than Jesse James". Connelly's family had not passed down the true story of their origins and only learned the truth during the 1980s, when a distant cousin from Ireland, who was representing the Garda Siochana at an international law enforcement conference in the American South, drove to Graceville and searched out the descendants of the prosperous Minnesota relative he had grown up hearing stories about.
- Elaine Davis's book Minnesota 13 recounts the involvement of Central Minnesota German- and Polish-American farm families in making moonshine during Prohibition. Davis also describes the involvement in the liquor trade of local politicians, police departments, Roman Catholic priests, and even Benedictine monks at Saint John's Abbey in Collegeville. She further reveals how high-quality locally produced moonshine, "Minnesota 13", was sold to Chicago Outfit boss Al Capone, Kid Cann, and other organized crime figures from the Twin Cities and beyond. Davis's book caused a boom in Central Minnesota breweries and distilleries and inspired the town of Holdingford to begin openly celebrating this part of its past.
- In December 2008, Leo K. Thorsness, a retired United States Air Force Colonel from Walnut Grove, Minnesota, and veteran of the Vietnam War, published the memoir Surviving Hell: A POW's Journey. The book describes Thorsness's six years as a prisoner of war in North Vietnam, during which his uncooperativeness earned him a year in solitary confinement and severe back injuries sustained during torture. Thorsness was awarded the Congressional Medal of Honor during his captivity, which was kept secret until after his release to prevent North Vietnamese guards from further torturing him. He was released during Operation Homecoming on March 4, 1973.
- Kao Kalia Yang's 2008 memoir The Latehomecomer: A Hmong Family Memoir tells the story of arriving in America from a refugee camp in Thailand and growing up in St. Paul's large Hmong-American community.
- Tom Mahoney's 2013 book Secret Partners: Big Tom Brown and the Barker Gang follows Maccabee's lead in investigating the Depression-era partnership between mobbed-up St. Paul Police Chief Thomas Archibald Brown and the Barker Gang. The book further reveals how and why, unlike other corrupt officers and every living member of the Barker Gang, Brown was able to avoid prosecution for his many capital crimes.
- In his 2013 book Augie's Secrets: The Minneapolis Mob and the King of the Hennepin Strip, journalist Neil Karlen, the great-grandnephew of mobbed-up Minneapolis burlesque club owner Augie Ratner, relates his family's oral history of organized crime within Minneapolis's Ashkenazi Jewish community.
- Erik Rivenes's 2018 book Dirty Doc Ames and the Scandal that Shook Minneapolis relates how, during his 1901–02 term, Minneapolis Mayor A.A. Ames fired all the cops appointed by his predecessors, sold their badges to career criminals, and then ordered his new cops to enforce a protection racket upon the city's brothels, gambling joints, and con artists for Ames's own considerable profit. Ames's resulting exposure and flight from prosecution brought Minneapolis national notoriety after The Shame of Minneapolis, an award-winning exposé by investigative journalist Lincoln Steffens, was published in McClure's Magazine and later included in his book The Shame of the Cities. According to Rivenes, Steffens was late onto the scene and Twin Cities' investigative journalists had already been publishing exposes of Ames's corruption from the very beginning of his last term as mayor of Minneapolis.
- Shawn Francis Peters's 2018 book The Infamous Harry Hayward: A True Account of Murder and Mesmerism in Gilded Age Minneapolis relates the story of Harry T. Hayward, the eldest son and heir to a wealthy and cultured White Anglo-Saxon Protestant family who were considered pillars of Twin Cities polite society during the Gilded Age. In a development that horrified and humiliated the many class-conscious families whose daughters he had courted, Hayward was arrested and put on trial for masterminding the Victorian era's crime of the century: the 1894 contract killing near Lake Calhoun of Catherine Ging, an Irish-American dressmaker, moneylender, and occasional associate in Hayward's criminal activities. Swedish-American triggerman Claus Blixt and Harry's younger brother Adry Hayward, who was standing up to him for the first time after a lifetime of systematic mental and emotional abuse, both testified against him. Harry Hayward was found guilty of first degree murder and sentenced to death by hanging. Due to his ability to dominate and manipulate others, the newspapers of the era dubbed Hayward "The Minneapolis Svengali", "the most cold-blooded murderer that ever walked God's footstool", and "the most bloodthirsty soul ever to usurp the human frame." In the hours before his hanging at Hennepin County Jail, Hayward gave a detailed interview about his life to his cousin Edward Goodsell as a court reporter took down every word. He confessed to numerous arsons, assaults, swindles, attempted murders, and three unsolved murders in New York City, the Sierra Madre Mountains of California, and New Jersey. Historian and true crime writer Jack El-Hai has written that, if Hayward's admissions are true, then he predates Dr. H. H. Holmes as America's first documented male serial killer.

=== Fiction ===
Minnesota has been home to many known fiction writers.

Laura Ingalls Wilder's novel On the Banks of Plum Creek is based on her memories of living in a dugout as part of a White Anglo-Saxon Protestant pioneer family near Walnut Grove, Minnesota.

F. Scott Fitzgerald grew up in a wealthy, cultured "Lace Curtain Irish" family that lived on Summit Avenue in St. Paul. Fitzgerald graduated from Princeton University and became, during the Jazz Age, a major figure in 20th century American literature. In several of his short stories, such as "The Ice Palace" and "Winter Dreams", he depicts his upbringing in the Twin Cities.

Although his award-winning novel Giants in the Earth takes place among Norwegian-American homesteaders in South Dakota, Ole Edvart Rølvaag wrote both it and its sequels while a professor at St. Olaf College in Northfield. The Northfield house where the author lived is now a museum.

Rølvaag's novels and his own research in memoirs of Swedish settlers on the Minnesota frontier inspired Swedish author Vilhelm Moberg to compose The Emigrants series of four novels between 1949 and 1959. They describe a Swedish family's emigration from Småland to Chisago County, Minnesota in the mid-19th century.

American poet, novelist, and essayist Siri Hustvedt grew up in Northfield, where her father, Lloyd Hustvedt, was a professor at St. Olaf College. She now lives in Brooklyn, New York.

Nobel Prize-winning novelist Sinclair Lewis was born and grew up in Sauk Centre, which he satirized as "Gopher's Prairie" in his novel Main Street. Although the people of Sauk Centre were reportedly deeply offended by the novel, Sauk Centre now celebrates it and uses it to attract tourism. The Stearns County Historical Society in St. Cloud has an extensive collection of materials relating to Lewis and his family, including many taped oral history interviews with Sauk Centre residents who knew him as a child.

==== Science Fiction and Fantasy ====
The Minneapolis-Saint Paul metropolitan area is the long-standing home of several fandom organizations such as SF Minnesota, MISFITS, and Mnstf, which annually hold Diversicon, CONvergence, and Minicon, respectively. These are large gatherings of fans interested in science, speculative, and fantasy fiction; panels are held where authors, publishers, and scientists interact with readers, viewers, and fans of filk music with the goal of increasing knowledge of the topics discussed.

== Minnesotan Dialect ==
=== Vowels ===
- /u/ and /oʊ/ are "conservative" in this region, meaning they do not undergo the fronting common in some other regions of the United States. In addition to being conservative, /oʊ/ may be monophthongal [o]. The same is true of /eɪ/, which can be realized as [e], though data suggests that monophthongal variants are more common for /oʊ/ than for /eɪ/, and also that they are more common in coat than in ago or road, which may indicate phonological conditioning.
  - Some speakers exhibit extreme raising of /æ/ before voiced velars (/ɡ/ and /ŋ/), with an up-glide, so that bag sounds close to beg or even as raised as the first syllable of bagel. Other examples of where this applies include the word flag and agriculture.
  - Raising of /aɪ/ is found in this region. It occurs before some voiced consonants. For example, many speakers pronounce fire, tiger, and spider with the raised vowel. Some speakers in this region raise /aʊ/ as well.
  - The onset of /aʊ/ when not subject to raising is often quite far back, resulting in pronunciations like [ɑʊ].
  - The cot–caught merger is common throughout the region, and the vowel can be quite forward: [ä].
  - The words roof and root may be variously pronounced with either /ʊ/ or /u/; that is, with the vowel of foot or boot, respectively. But this is highly variable, and these words are pronounced both ways in other parts of the country.

=== Consonants ===
Word-initial th-stopping is possible among speakers of working-class backgrounds, especially with pronouns ("deez" for these, "doze" for those, "dem" for them, etc.). In addition, traces of a pitch accent as in Swedish and Norwegian persists in some areas of heavy Norwegian or Swedish settlement, and among people who grew up in those areas (some of whom are not of Scandinavian descent).

=== Phonemic incidence ===
Certain phonemes appear in particular words, setting the North-Central dialect apart from some other American English:

- absurd often uses /z/ (rather than /s/)
- anti often uses /aɪ/ (rather than /i/)
- aunt often uses /ɑ/ (rather than /æ/)
- roof often uses /ʊ/ (rather than /u/)
- turbine often uses /ən/ (rather than /aɪn/): the same pronunciation as turban

=== Vocabulary ===
- skyway, a hallway-bridge connecting two buildings
- eh?, a question tag
- frontage road, a service or access road
- hotdish, a simple entree cooked in a single dish, like a casserole
- ope, similar to uff da
- pop or soda pop, a sweet carbonated soft drink
- parking ramp, a multi-story parking structure
- rummage sale, a yard or garage sale
- sliver, a splinter
- spendy, expensive or high-priced
- stocking cap, a knit wool hat
- Don't ya know, phrase used at the end of a sentence to make sure the listener understands
- Uff da, a Scandinavian exclamation or interjection used to express dismay, surprise, astonishment, exhaustion, or relief
- ubetcha, alternate way of saying "you bet"

== Arts ==
=== Music ===
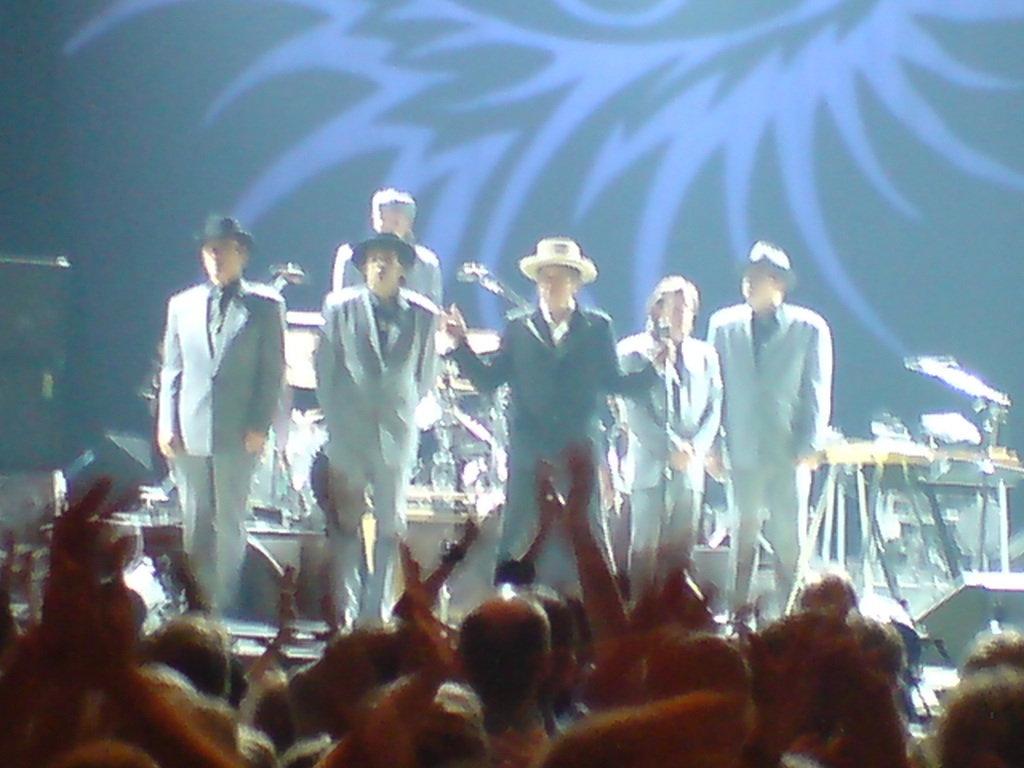
Bob Dylan and his band in 2007

Music has played a significant role in Minnesota's historical and cultural development. The state's music scene centers on Minneapolis-Saint Paul, and most Minnesotan artists who have become nationally popular either came from that area or debuted there. Rural Minnesota has also produced a flourishing folk music scene, with a long tradition of traditional Swedish, Finnish and Norwegian music.

In Avon, Minnesota, Cy Pfannenstein Music Service both records and distributes, among other things, traditional music by local German-, Polish-, and Slovenian-American folk musicians.

In 1893, during his stay in the Czech-American farming community of Spillville, Iowa, composer Antonín Dvořák read a translation into Czech of Henry Wadsworth Longfellow's The Song of Hiawatha and decided to visit Minnehaha Falls. Dvořák's visit on September 5, 1893, inspired him to compose a tune he wrote down on his shirt cuff that later became the second movement of his Sonatina in G Major. Fritz Kreisler dubbed the tune the "Minnehaha Melody".

Minnesota's modern local music scene is home to thousands of bands, many of which perform with some regularity. Some performers from nearby regions of neighboring states, such as western Wisconsin and Fargo, North Dakota, are often considered part of the Minnesota music scene.

Minneapolis has produced a number of famous performers, such as Bob Dylan, who, though born in Duluth and raised in Hibbing, began his musical career in the Minneapolis area, and Jimmy Jam and Terry Lewis, who eventually formed The Time and produced for Gladys Knight and Janet Jackson. Minneapolis's most influential contributions to American popular music began in the 1970s and 1980s, when its music scene expanded the state's cultural identity and launched the careers of acclaimed performers like the multi-platinum soul singer Prince and cult favorites The Replacements and Hüsker Dü. More recently, the Twin Cities have played a role in the national hip-hop scene with record labels Rhymesayers Entertainment and Kamorra Entertainment and artists such as Atmosphere, Brother Ali, P.O.S and Manny Phesto. Musicians of various other genres have been popular, including harmony singers The Andrews Sisters, the alternative rock group Semisonic, Owl City, and the cult favorites Motion City Soundtrack.

=== Fine arts ===
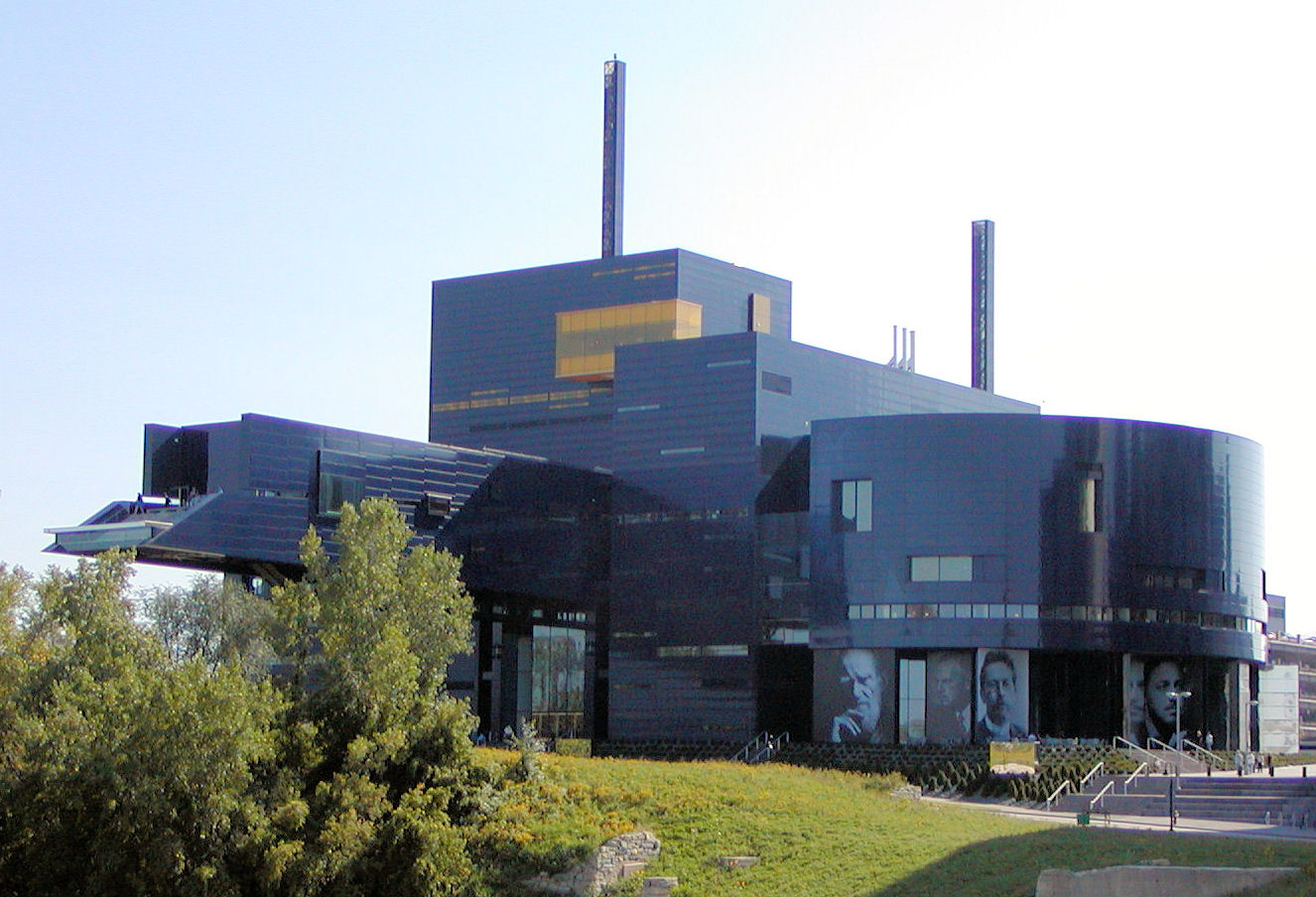
Guthrie Theater on the Mississippi River, Minneapolis

The Minneapolis-Saint Paul metropolitan area is considered the arts capital of the Upper Midwest. Its major fine art museums include the Minneapolis Institute of Art, the Walker Art Center, and the Frederick R. Weisman Art Museum. The Minnesota Orchestra and the Saint Paul Chamber Orchestra are prominent full-time professional orchestras that perform concerts and offer educational programs. Attendance at theatrical, musical, and comedy events in the area is high, which may be attributed to the cold winters, the large population of post-secondary students, and a generally vibrant economy. In 2006 the nationally renowned Guthrie Theater moved into a new building overlooking the Mississippi River with three stages. The number of theater seats per capita in Minneapolis-Saint Paul ranks behind only New York City among U.S. cities; in 2000, 2.3 million theater tickets were sold. The Minnesota Fringe Festival is an annual celebration of theater, dance, improvisation, puppetry, kids' shows, visual art, and musicals. It consists of over 800 performances in 11 days, and is the nation's largest non-juried performing arts festival. Minneapolis's Children's Theatre Company, and St. Paul's SteppingStone Theatre for Youth Development are leading youth theaters.

The public radio program A Prairie Home Companion, hosted by Minnesota native Garrison Keillor, aired live for many years from the Fitzgerald Theater in St. Paul. The show ended its run in 2016. Its successor, Live from Here, aired from the same venue.

==== Architecture ====
Native Americans built roughly 12,000 burial mounds before white colonization. The largest surviving one is the Grand Mound in Koochiching County, built by the Laurel culture. Ojibwe and Dakota people also built houses and ceremonial structures, including sweat lodges, sedentary wigwams, and transportable tipis. One of the first structures built by European fur traders was the Grand Portage great hall, first built in the 1780s and rebuilt in the 1970s.

Fort Snelling, one of Minnesota's first colonial buildings, was constructed using Platteville limestone between 1820 and 1825. In central Minnesota, white settlers also began building dwellings, including mansions that used Greek Revival and Second Empire architecture, such as the Alexander Ramsey House. During industrialization, mills, including the Washburn A and Pillsbury A, were built in Minneapolis and St. Paul, along with other structures like the Stone Arch Bridge. In rural Minnesota, grain elevators became prominent features of small towns, including Moorhead's Bruns and Finkle elevator.

In the 1880s, Eastlake, Queen Anne, Colonial Revival, and Shingle architecture became popular for Twin Cities homes. Romanesque Revival style also inspired the construction of Minneapolis City Hall and the James J. Hill House. Public works projects during this time also spawned large projects like the Winona County Courthouse, Duluth's Central High School, and the Landmark Center, many of which were influenced by landscape architect Horace Cleveland.

Minnesota's architecture diversified and changed between 1910 and 1930, with the introduction of Beaux-Arts, the Arts and Crafts movement, and Art Deco. In the 1910s, City Beautiful planners constructed such buildings as the Minneapolis Institute of Art, the Cathedral of St. Paul, the Saint Paul Public Library, and the James J. Hill Center in the Beaux-Arts style. The University of Minnesota's Northrop Mall and Duluth's Civic Center are also products of the City Beautiful movement.

At the same time, the Prairie School, led by Frank Lloyd Wright, spread to Minnesota, with William Gray Purcell and George Grant Elmslie as its foremost advocates. Prairie School buildings in Minnesota include the Edna S. Purcell House, Winona's Merchants National Bank, and the National Farmers' Bank of Owatonna. By the 1920s, Tudor and Romanesque Revival architecture came into fashion. Most of St. Paul's and Minneapolis's old homes are in that style. Art Deco became popular in the late 1920s and early 1930s; examples include the Foshay Tower, the Rand Tower Hotel, the Rice County Courthouse and Jail, and the Saint Paul City Hall and Ramsey County Courthouse.

During the suburbanization of the 1950s, Mid-century modern architecture took hold in Minnesota, including at Edina's Southdale Mall, Minneapolis's Christ Church Lutheran, Collegeville's Saint John's Abbey, and the original Guthrie Theater. The later postmodern style produced Minneapolis's Lake Harriet Bandshell and Refectory. Since the 1970s, modernist architects in Minnesota have focused on skyscrapers and big-box architecture. Buildings in these styles include Philip Johnson's IDS Center, César Pelli's Wells Fargo Center and Minneapolis Central Library, Frank Gehry's Weisman Art Museum, Herzog & de Meuron's addition to the Walker Art Center, and Jean Nouvel's redesigned Guthrie Theater.

== Weather ==
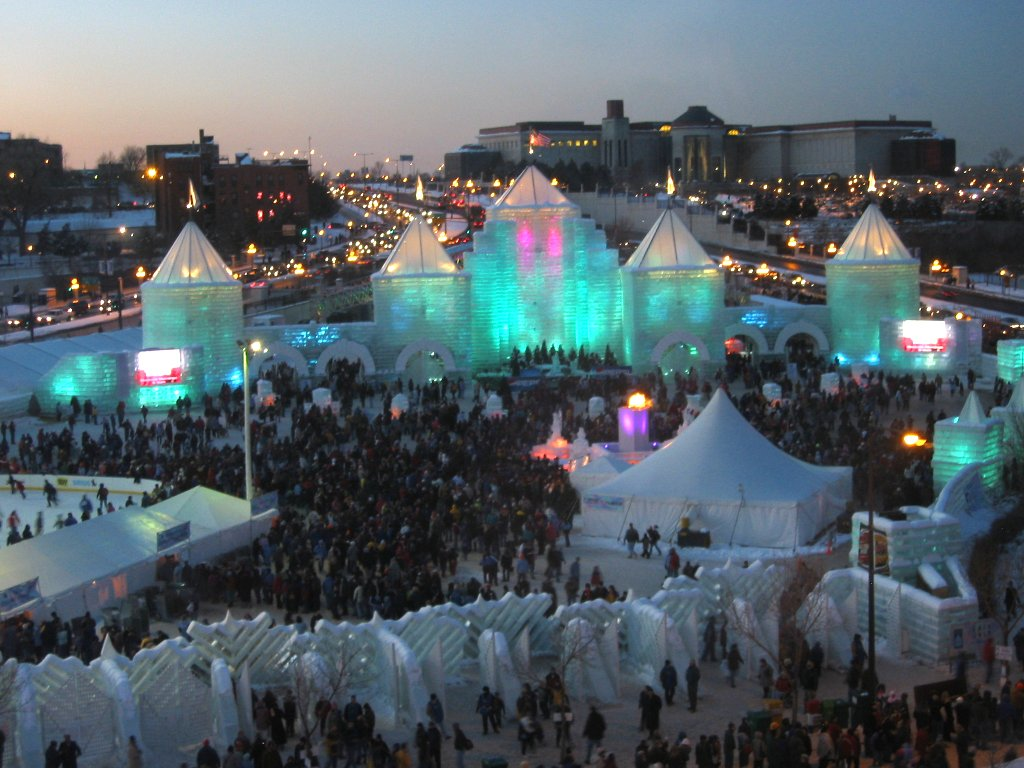
St. Paul Winter Carnival, 2004

Minnesota's climate has done much to shape the state's image and culture. Minnesotans boast of their "theater of seasons", with a late but intense spring, a summer of watersports, a fall of brilliantly colored leaves in the state's parks and hardwood forests, and a long winter made bearable by outdoor sports and recreation.

"Summer at the lake" is a Minnesota tradition. Water skiing was invented in Minnesota by Ralph Samuelson, and the Minneapolis Aquatennial features a milk carton boat race. Contestants build boats from milk cartons and float them on Minneapolis-area lakes, with recognition based more on colorful and imaginative designs than on actual racing performance.

To many outsiders, Minnesota's winters seem cold and inhospitable. Even among Minnesotans, a common expression is that there are only two seasons, winter and road construction. (The long winters damage road surfaces, and the annual frenzy of repair work causes traffic congestion.) A World War II newscaster, describing the brutally cold conditions of the Russian front, stated that at least Minnesotans could understand it. A New York journalist visited St. Paul and declared the city "another Siberia, unfit for human habitation." In response, the city built a huge ice palace in 1886, similar to one that Montreal had built in 1885. It hired the architects of the Canadian ice palace to design one for St. Paul, and built a palace 106 feet (32.3 m) high with ice blocks cut from a nearby lake. This began the tradition of the Saint Paul Winter Carnival, which spawned a legend with the King Boreas. Each winter, Boreas declares a ten-day celebration with feasting, fun, and frolic, along with the Queen of the Snows and singer Klondike Kate. Ice sculptures are featured, and periodically ice palaces are built; one was the setting of Fitzgerald's story "The Ice Palace", published in Flappers and Philosophers. On the tenth day of the festival, Vulcanus Rex, the king of fire, storms the castle with his Vulcan Krewe, compelling Boreas to relinquish winter's hold on the land until he returns again.

== Tourism ==
Tourism has become an important industry, especially in the northern lakes region. In the North Country, what had been an industrial area focused on mining and logging has largely been transformed into a vacation destination. Popular interest in the environment and environmentalism, added to traditional interests in hunting and fishing, has attracted a large urban audience within driving range. The memory of the great logging industry is exemplified by local folklore.

The headwaters of the Mississippi River are at Itasca State Park, where archaeologists have found artifacts showing that the lakeshore was inhabited more than 2,000 years ago and that, at that time, American bison were routinely driven into the swampy ground along Lake Itasca to be speared to death at close range.

Pipestone National Monument, where the Dakota people used to quarry pipestone long before European settlement, remains a popular tourist attraction.

In 1732, when Minnesota was still part of New France, Pierre Gaultier de Varennes, sieur de La Vérendrye, built Fort St. Charles on Lake of the Woods as part of his many expeditions to the far west of Lake Superior and into the Great Plains in search of the Northwest Passage. The fort was ultimately the burial place of the explorer's son, Jean Baptiste de La Vérendrye, and his Jesuit chaplain, Jean-Pierre Aulneau. It was found in 1908, based on the oral tradition of Natives, excavated, and rebuilt in the 1950s by the Knights of Columbus.

Grand Portage National Monument is on Lake Superior's north shore and preserves a vital center of fur trade activity and Anishinaabeg Ojibwe heritage. Until the end of the American Revolution, Grand Portage was one of the British Empire's four main fur trading centers in North America, along with Fort Niagara, Fort Detroit, and Fort Michilimackinac.

Fort Snelling, built by the United States Army during the 1820s at the confluence of the Mississippi and Minnesota Rivers, remains a popular tourism site and sometimes hosts historical reenactments.

Sites related to the Dakota War of 1862 are also popular tourist sites. These include the battlefields at Fort Ridgely, Birch Coulee, and Wood Lake. In Hutchinson, Minnesota, a statue of Dakota Chief Little Crow stands where a settler shot him in the back while picking raspberries.

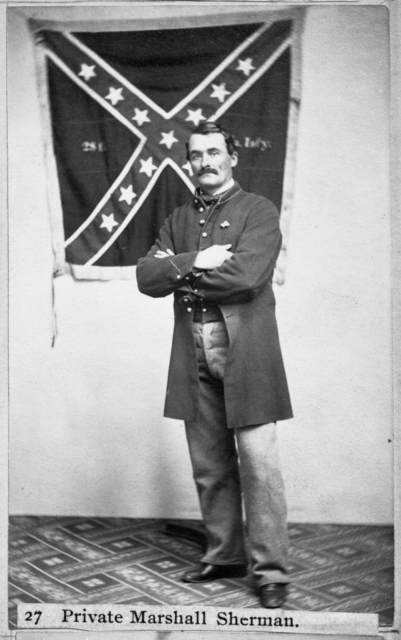
Marshall Sherman poses with the 28th Virginia battle flag in 1864

The American flags Minnesota's Union Army regiments carried during the American Civil War are displayed under the rotunda of the State Capitol. During the repulse of Pickett's Charge on the third day of the Battle of Gettysburg, Private Marshall Sherman of the 1st Minnesota Infantry Regiment captured the regimental colors of the 28th Virginia Infantry, which now belongs to Minnesota as a war trophy. For this feat, Sherman was awarded the Congressional Medal of Honor. Despite the State of Virginia's repeated requests, demands, and threats of lawsuits for the flag's return, Minnesota Governor Mark Dayton once explained, "It was taken in a battle with the cost of the blood of all these Minnesotans. It would be a sacrilege to return it to them. It's something that was earned through the incredible courage and valor of the men who gave their lives and risked their lives to obtain it... ...As far as I'm concerned it is a closed subject." Some years earlier, Minnesota Governor Jesse Ventura had been more succinct: "We won... We took it. That makes it our heritage."

Since they were first built as a petition for relief from the 1870s Rocky Mountain locust plague, the Assumption Chapel and Calvary Hill near Cold Spring have been a place of Christian pilgrimage. There is a similar outdoor Way of the Cross in New Ulm.

Minnesota is not usually considered part of the Wild West, but the James-Younger Gang's 1876 failed bank robbery and gun battle with local townspeople is celebrated annually with a festival and historical reenactment in Northfield.

In St. Joseph, the grave of Sister Annella Zervas, a Benedictine nun and candidate for Roman Catholic sainthood, is a site of Christian pilgrimage.

The childhood home of aviator and best-selling memoirist Charles Lindbergh is preserved as a tourist attraction in Little Falls.

The Minnesota State Fair, advertised as The Great Minnesota Get-Together, is an icon of state culture. More than two million people attended the fair in 2018. The fair covers the variety of Minnesota life, including fine art, science, agriculture, food preparation, 4-H displays, music, the midway, and corporate merchandising. It is known for its displays of seed art, butter sculptures of dairy princesses, and the birthing barn. On a smaller scale, these attractions are also offered at the state's many county fairs.

Other large annual festivals include the Minneapolis Aquatennial, Lakes Jam, the Mill City Music Festival, Detroit Lakes's 10,000 Lakes Festival and WE Fest, and Moondance Jam & Jammin' Country, both held every summer in Walker.

In St. Paul, which has a large Irish-American community, there is an annual parade on St. Patrick's Day. St. Paul also has an annual Irish Fair. It was the largest free Irish fair in the U.S. until it began charging for admission in 2021.

As Minnesota has always had a very large Polish-American population, the Polish Cultural Association of Minnesota hosts an annual Polish Festival in Minneapolis.

The Minnesota Renaissance Festival takes place every year in Chaska.

== Popular culture ==
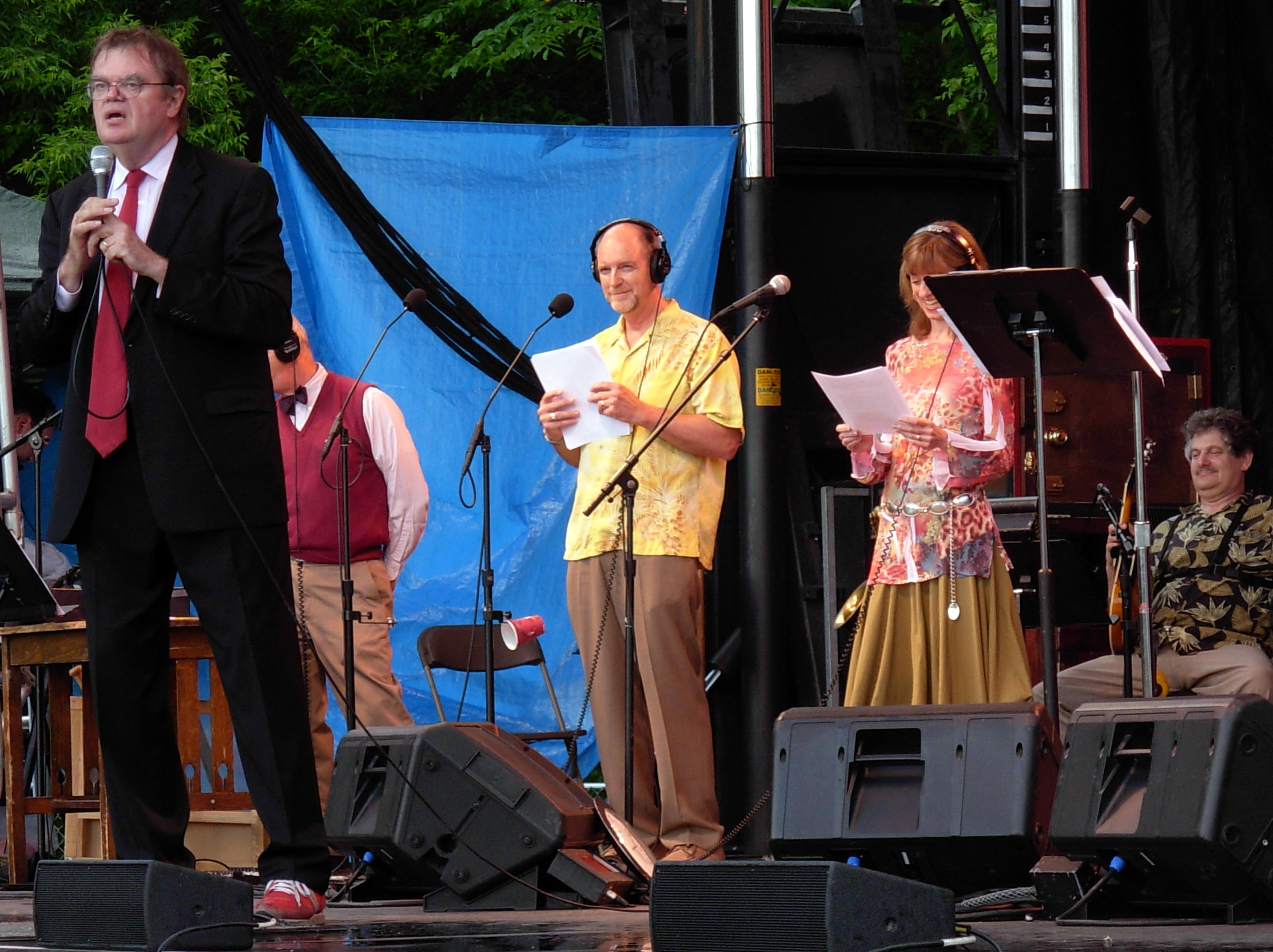
A Prairie Home Companion live radio show

- A statue of Mary Tyler Moore on downtown Minneapolis's Nicollet Mall commemorates the 1970s television situation comedy The Mary Tyler Moore Show.
- Mystery Science Theater 3000 filmed its first 11 seasons in the Minneapolis area, first at KTMA and then at Best Brains Studios in Eden Prairie.
- Swedish film director Jan Troell in 1971 and 1972 turned Vilhelm Moberg's The Emigrants series into two major feature films, The Emigrants and The New Land, starring Max von Sydow and Liv Ullmann. They were nominated for several Academy Awards and The New Land won Golden Globe Awards.
- On the TV series Beverly Hills, 90210, twins Brandon and Brenda Walsh were transplants from Minneapolis.
- Six of the main characters of Nickelodeon's Big Time Rush are from Minnesota.
- Minnesota's winters are the setting of the Hollywood comedies Grumpy Old Men and Grumpier Old Men, which star Jack Lemmon and Walter Matthau. Both films are set in Wabasha but were filmed in St. Paul.
- The Coen Brothers' film Fargo, along with its spin-off TV series, also feature the backdrop of a Minnesota winter. The film primarily takes place in Minneapolis and Brainerd. Bemidji and Duluth are the main settings for the TV show. Characters in both speak with exaggerated Minnesota accents.
- The 1999 mockumentary Drop Dead Gorgeous centers around a beauty pageant and was filmed near Waconia, Minnesota. The characters have exaggerated Minnesota accents and stereotypical Midwestern Scandinavian Lutheran traits. The film is notable as the first onscreen appearance of actress Amy Adams. Long neglected, Drop Dead Gorgeous is now a cult classic.
- Ali Selim's award-winning 2005 film Sweet Land centers around a German mail-order bride who immigrates from the Weimar Republic to a Norwegian-American farming community in Becker County, Minnesota and must face the intense Germanophobia that still lingers after the end of World War I. Sweet Land was filmed near Montevideo, in Chippewa County.
- The winner of Last Comic Standing's season 4 was St. Paul native Josh Blue.
- The actor winning the role of "Sandy" on the televised Grease: You're the One that I Want! competition was Laura Osnes, an Eagan native; she played Sandy in the 2007 Broadway run of Grease.
- The sitcom How I Met Your Mother's character Marshall Eriksen is a proud Minnesotan from St. Cloud. Some episodes are set there.
- The Coen Brothers' 2009 film A Serious Man is set among the Ashkenazi Jewish community in the Minneapolis suburb of St. Louis Park during the late 1960s.
