= Morgan Creek Vineyards =

Morgan Creek Vineyards may refer to:

- Morgan Creek Vineyards (Alabama)
- Morgan Creek Vineyards (Minnesota)
