= Stangland =

Stangland is a locational surname of Norwegian origin, which means a person from one of several places called Stangland in Norway. A related name is Stangeland. The name may refer to:

- Red Stangland (1922–1995), American radio broadcaster and humorist
- Robert Stangland (1881–1953), American athlete
