= Glenn Wasicuna =

Dakota elder and language expert

- Wambdi Wapaha
- Born: June 5, 1950; Sioux Valley Dakota Nation
- Died: May 3, 2025 (aged 74)
- Spouse: Gwen Westerman

Glenn Wasicuna (Dakota: Wambdi Wapaha; June 5, 1950–May 3, 2025) was a Dakota elder and language expert who worked to preserve the Dakota language as a professor and through public outreach in Minnesota.

== Dakota language revitalization ==
Wasicuna began teaching the Dakota language in 1998. He worked with all four federally recognized Dakota communities in Minnesota: Upper Sioux Indian Community, Lower Sioux Indian Community, Shakopee Mdewakaton Sioux Community, and the Prairie Island Indian Community. He also worked with the Sisseton Wahpeton Oyate in South Dakota. He was the Director of Dakota Studies, Tiospa Zina Tribal School for the Shakopee Mdewakanton Sioux community, as he worked to start a Dakota language program there in 2000. He also taught classes in Prior Lake. He also taught teaching Dakota at Gustavus Adolphus College and served as a consultant to the University of Minnesota on the Dakota language.

In 2019, he became a professor at Minnesota State University, Mankato to teach the Dakota language, and was the first Dakota language teacher at the college. He said he wanted to become a professor so that he could "teach the teachers" about Dakota. He had already been teaching for more than 20 years. His language teachings connected to Dakota cultural teachings, and when he taught Dakota people the language, he saw it as a healing experience.

He was active in public spaces using the Dakota language, such as when he sang a Dakota song with Jason Mack and Dave Brave Heart at a Thanksgiving Eve worship service at First Congregational United Congregational Church in 2019. In 2020, he spoke at a Veterans for Peace march commemorating the Dakota 38.

He and his wife, Gwen Westerman, appeared in a number of documentaries about the Dakota language. They also traveled to Sweden and Norway and participated in programs about indigenous languages, an event which came after Wasicuna met Sofia Jannock, a Sapmi musician from Norway. Wasicuna and Westerman also served as members of the Indian Advisory Committee for the Minnesota Historical Society.

Along with working with the Minnesota Historical Society on exhibits, he also served as an advisor for a new-in-2021 exhibit at the Minnesota Children's Museum, where he said "If you want to include the Dakota people here, use the language." The exhibit is interactive for children and includes Wasicuna pronouncing Dakota words.

Wasicuna was involved with book projects, including Mni Sota Makoce: The Land of the Dakota by Gwen Westerman and Bruce M. White, for which he wrote the introduction and served as the Dakota cultural and language advisor. With Westerman, he contributed the chapter "Across Space and Time: Letters from the Dakota People, 1838-1878" to the book Indigenous Languages and the Promise of Archives.

== Early life and education ==
Wasicuna was born in the Sioux Valley Dakota Nation in Manitoba. He attended a school on the reserve from K-8, and went to an Indian residential school for high school. He grew up speaking Dakota and learned the English language in school. When he was at the residential school, he was punished for speaking Dakota, with one punishment being copying by hand an entire English dictionary page.

In 1984, Wasicuna graduated from the University of Western Ontario and received his degree in journalism. He worked as an editor and publisher of the Dakota Times and as Indian Country Today's Canadian bureau manager.

Wasicuna married Gwen Westerman, who he met working on Dakota language at Shakopee. She was Minnesota's third Poet Laureate.

His obituary was written in Dakota, meant to underscore the importance of Dakota as a living language. Prior to his death, he was one of only two teachers in Minnesota who spoke Dakota as their first language.
