= Stangeland =

Stangeland, also spelled Stangaland, may refer to:

- Stangeland, Sandnes, city borough in Sandnes Municipality
- Stangaland Municipality, former municipality, now part of Karmøy Municipality
- Stangeland (surname), toponymic surname of Norwegian origin
