= Red Stangland =

American radio personality (1922–1995)

Eider Clifford "Red" Stangland (February 7, 1922 – August 8, 1995) was an American radio broadcaster and humorist. He wrote numerous joke books focused on Upper Midwestern humor, most notably a series of titles about the fictional characters Ole and Lena.

== Biography ==
Eider C. Stangland began his radio career as an announcer and ended it as a station owner. He owned KIWA AM and FM in Sheldon, Iowa, and had owned the former KCHF AM and FM stations in Sioux Falls, South Dakota. Stangland wrote numerous joke books centered on the Nordic characters at the center of jokes that predate his works and go back at least to the 1940s.

== Humor ==
The jokes have had a long tradition in the Upper Midwest, and Stangland's putting them in book form helped promote the popularity of the jokes and the characters. They are legendary among the Lutherans of Scandinavian heritage (mostly Norwegian and Swedish) throughout the Midwest and with outsiders who know them. The main characters are Lena, her boyfriend Ole, and his buddy Sven.

The jokes themselves are part of the cultural heritage also symbolized by expressions such as Uff Da, ya sure and you betcha. There was a great rivalry between the Swedes and Norwegians that carries over from the rivalry of the European nations and continued in the Midwest. The jokes may have served to bridge this divide, especially as the two groups intermarried in the United States.

No one is certain when and where Ole and Lena jokes began, but they may have come from self-deprecating Scandinavian-Americans making fun of themselves and each other. There is no indication the jokes are widely known in Scandinavia.

The joke books have been given away at Nordic Heritage Club events and are signature of Midwestern regional humor. This self-deprecating outlook has been referred to as the "uff da" world view.

Some of the jokes are short quips.

- I take my wife Lena everywhere, but she keeps finding her way back.

Most of the jokes are intentionally long and a bit droll, causing an uff da from listeners.

- "Ole and Lena are sitting at their dining room table, listening to the radio and watching it snow out. All of a sudden there is a big message on the radio, "There is a snow emergency, please park your car on the odd side of the street." So Ole puts on his clothes and goes out to move his car. The next day the same thing, another snow emergency and the radio says, "Please park your car on the even side of the street." So Ole goes and parks his car on the even side of the street. A few days later there's a really bad snow storm and the radio says, "There's been a snow emergency please move your car to the ..." and the radio goes out. And Lena says to Ole, "Oh, forget it. Just leave your car in the garage this time."

== Published works ==
- Ethnic Jokes with Joe Thompson and Don Steinbeck (Norse Press, 1974)
- Norwegian Jokes (Norse Press, 1978)
- Uff Da Jokes with Don Steinbeck (Norse Press, 1979)
- Polish & Other Ethnic Jokes (Norse Press, 1980)
- Son of Norwegian Jokes (Norse Press, 1980)
- Grandson of Norwegian Jokes (Norse Press, 1982)
- How to Become Your Boss (Norse Press, 1983)
- More Uff Da Jokes with Don Steinbeck (Norse Press, 1984)
- O Lutefisk: a Nostalgic Look Back to Those Good Old Days (Norse Press, 1985)
- Ole & Lena Jokes (Norse Press, 1986)
- More Ole & Lena Jokes (Norse Press, 1987)
- Norwegian Stories: World's Largest Collection of Rib-tickling Ethnic Humor (Norse Press, 1988)
- Ole & Lena Jokes, Book III (Norse Press, 1988)
- The New O Lutefisk: a Book of Pure Nostalgia (Norse Press, 1989)
- Ole & Lena Jokes, Book 4 with Marian Henjum (Norse Press, 1989)
- Ole & Lena Jokes, Book 5 (Norse Press, 1990)
- Red Stangland's Norwegian Home Companion (Dorset Press, 1990)
- Blonde Jokes (Norse Press, 1991)
- Ole & Lena Jokes, Book 5 (Norse Press, 1992)
- Red Stangland's Best Party Zingers (1992)
- Ole & Lena Jokes, Book 6 (Norse Press, 1992)
- The World's Funniest Roast Jokes (Meadowbrook Press, 1992)
- Ole & Lena Jokes, Book 7 (Norse Press, 1993)
- Ole & Lena Jokes, Book 8 (Norse Press, 1994)
