= Mni Sota Makoce: The Land of the Dakota =

Dakota history book

- Author: Gwen Westerman; Bruce M. White
- Cover artist: Quilt by Gwen Westerman; photo by Bill Jolitz; cover design by Percolator
- Subject: Dakota history; Dakota language; Minnesota history
- Publisher: Minnesota Historical Society Press
- Publication date: September 1, 2012
- Publication place: United States
- Media type: print
- Pages: 296
- Awards: Hognander Minnesota History Award; Minnesota Book Awards; AASLH Award of Merit
- ISBN: 978-0-87351-869-7 paper
- OCLC: 793221826
- Website: shop.mnhs.org/products/mni-sota-makoce

Mni Sota Makoce: The Land of the Dakota is a non-fiction book on Dakota history in Minnesota which focuses on the Dakota connection to location and language. The book is written by Dakota historian and professor Gwen Westerman (Sisseton Wahpeton Oyate) and Bruce M. White, with a foreword by Glenn Wasicuna (Sioux Valley Dakota Nation). It was published in 2012 by Minnesota Historical Society Press. The book analyzes and translates back into English the Dakota-language version of the 1851 Treaty of Traverse des Sioux for the first time, highlighting discrepancies between what the Dakota and treaty negotiators thought they were agreeing with. Although the U.S.–Dakota War of 1862 is alluded to, the war isn't covered. Mni Sota Makoce focuses on Dakota history outside the war, including events that led to the war, and the aftermath for Dakota people.

== Overview ==
Mni Sota Makoce covers Dakota history in Minnesota from pre-contact to the modern era. The authors present this history from a Dakota point of view, explicitly against the "dominan[t] non-Dakota master story about the Dakota people". It is notable for its approach to interpreting Dakota oral history, primary sources, and previously published history materials in combination. Core analysis describes Dakota place relations (or "land memories"), including via Dakota language and stories. Westerman and White outline their method in the introduction and "Chapter Two: Reading Between the Lines of the Historical Record." Dakota language is represented with a widely accepted modern Dakota orthography developed by Waḣpetonwiŋ (Carolynn Schommer), from the University of Minnesota. This book analyzes and translates back into English the Dakota-language version of the 1851 Treaty of Traverse des Sioux for the first time, highlighting discrepancies between what the Dakota and treaty negotiators thought they were agreeing with.

Chapters consist largely of narrative-style history gleaned from source analysis interspersed with sidebars (sometimes authored by individual contributors) which provide further context on a specific source. In "Chapter One: Homelands," a sidebar entitled "Otókahe / The Beginning" attributed to Erin Griffin summarizes an anthropological analysis of where the Dakota people originated geographically, followed by additional sidebars throughout the chapter such as "Not One Creation Story, But Many," "Bdote Mni Sota / Mouth of the Minnesota River," and "Oc̣eti Ṡaḳowiŋ / The Seven Fires of the Dakota."

The Dakota War of 1862 is only alluded to and isn't covered. Mni Sota Makoce focuses on Dakota history outside the war, including events that led to the war, and the aftermath for Dakota people.

The book is illustrated primarily with period artwork such as from Seth Eastman and George Catlin, with a sixteen page color insert halfway through the book with larger reproductions of works depicting detailed scenes of Dakota lifeways and historical figures such as Iṡtaḣba (Sleepy Eye) and C̣etaŋ Wakuwa Mani (Little Crow).

The final chapter "Chapter Five: Reclaiming Minnesota–Mni Sota Makoce" details the Dakota aftermath to the 1851 treaties with the U.S. government and the war of 1862, which culminated in Dakota exiled from the territory. Over time, some Dakota have returned to Minnesota, and many modern Dakota aim to reclaim and protect historic villages and sacred sites. Sites in Bdote such as Coldwater Spring and Wakaŋ Tipi (now part of Indian Mounds Regional Park) are emphasized for their especially sacred significance to Dakota people.

== Background ==
Mni Sota Makoce rose out of a grant-funded initiative to further develop understanding of Dakota history, particularly concepts of Dakota land tenure. Funding was provided by the Indian Land Tenure Foundation and the Minnesota Historical Society. Gwen Westerman and Bruce White were co-chairs, with historian and TRCDC representative Syd Beane (Flandreau Santee Sioux) directing. The results of their study were published as Mni Sota Makoce for the 150th anniversary of the U.S.–Dakota War of 1862.

Two Rivers Community Development Corporation (TRCDC), formed in 2007 by Dakota searching for ways to re-involve Dakota in their historic lands, convened the Dakota Land Research Project in conjunction with the Indian Land Tenure Foundation, which funded archival and oral history research from 2008 to 2009. Native American Community Development Institute (NACDI) served as TRCDC's fiscal sponsor. Beane was appointed project director, Westerman led oral interviews, and White led archival research. A large amount of contributors were involved including TRCDC representative Sheldon Wolfchild, anthropologist Erin Griffin (Sisseton Wahpeton Oyate, Westerman's daughter), doctoral student in American Studies Kate Beane (Flandreau Santee Sioux), historian Thomas Shaw, Mitchell Hamline School of Law Emeritus Professor of Law Howard Vogel, and Dakota cultural and language advisor Glenn Wasicuna (Westerman's husband). Writing and producing the book was funded by the Minnesota Arts and Cultural Heritage Fund via the Minnesota Historical Society, which resulted in the published volume in 2012. The Mni Sota Makoce draft was completed in June 2011. Two years were spent on research and two years on writing the book. In total, the project took five years from research in 2008 to publishing in 2012.

Publication was planned for 2012 to commemorate the 150th anniversary of the U.S.–Dakota War to offer a Dakota perspective on the causes and effects of the war, and make available Dakota history outside the war. Dakota were anticipating increased coverage for the anniversary, primarily from non-Dakota perspectives. Westerman said there was a need for Dakota history to be told from a Dakota perspective, where Dakota sources were treated as authoritative. Previously most literature was from white perspectives which treated Dakota knowledge with suspicion. Reviewer Gregory O. Gagnon (Bad River Band of the Lake Superior Tribe of Chippewa Indians), professor of Indian Law at Loyola University New Orleans who has published Dakota histories, said that prior to the publication of Mni Sota Makoce "the best" books on Dakota history were History of the Santee Sioux by Roy Willard Meyer and Kinsmen of Another Kind by Gary Clayton Anderson, each published or revised in 1986 and 1984 respectively, and neither written by a Dakota person. In the Introduction to Mni Sota Makoce, Westerman and White explain: "The answer to many of the problems presented by Dakota history as it has been written in the past is to try to achieve a more complete account, one that gives full appreciation to the Dakota oral tradition but also makes an effort to read between the lines of written records to search for Dakota points of view and Dakota meanings." Unlike previous Dakota history books, Westerman and White interpret a number of sources in combination, including what the authors call "nonverbal sources" such as archeological sites like burial mounds and petroglyphs. The book uses multiple disciplines including geography, anthropology, history, law, and literature. Kate Beane later praised cowriter White and contributor Vogel for their work with and prior to Mni Sota Makoce that is "community centered" and "compassionate": "The lack of a personal agenda in their work is made obvious in that they share their findings with communities and work with Dakota people as collaborators and allies, providing an understanding of the need for a work ethic rooted in social justice when writing about those who have been historically oppressed." She contrasts it with previous Dakota histories which perpetuate stereotypes and settler-exclusive perspectives, criticizing Kinsmen and Walt Bachman’s Northern Slave Black Dakota: The Life and Time of Joseph Godfrey specifically. Kinsmen author Anderson does not believe Dakota were subject to genocide, but allows the label ethnic cleansing, which is contrary to dominant Dakota thought and genocide studies analysis. (Note: Whether ethnic cleansing or genocide apply to Dakota experiences is debated. Prominent white historian of Dakota history Gary Clayton Anderson argues that Dakota people were not subjected to genocide, but were rather ethnically cleansed. In the 2014 book Ethnic Cleansing and the Indian: The Crime That Should Haunt America, Anderson argues that genocide is defined by the Holocaust, thus precluding Dakota who did not face the same conditions, and that since some Dakota still survive, the scale of death did not constitute "mass killings" equal to those seen in the Holocaust. Previously in 2012 Anderson made similar assertions on the basis of the 1998 Rome Statute, an interpretation that Westerman disputes in an article for Albany Government Law Review. Dakota scholars such as Waziyatawin characterize Dakota experiences as both genocide and ethnic cleansing. Minnesota Historical Society includes the perspective that what happened is genocide in its materials, but stops short of endorsing it. Similarly, the University of Minnesota Holocaust and Genocide Studies program offers their own resources about Dakota history, some which use the term genocide, but do not endorse a position themselves. Reviewing Anderson's Ethnic Cleansing, Margaret Jacobs argues that neither ethnic cleansing nor genocide are accurate, and rather the term settler colonialism should be used. For a review of Ethnic Cleansing in the journal Settler Colonial Studies, Carol P. Kakel III endorses both genocide and ethnic cleansing, noting that ethnic cleansing is a facet of genocide, while suggesting that examining such concepts within the framework of settler colonialism will offer more clarity when relating Indigenous history.) Anderson later told Westerman during an event commemorating the war's 150th anniversary that he does not consider oral history in his practice, which is the vehicle for most Dakota-perspective history. Meyer's preface in History of the Santee Sioux similarly explains "I have made no attempt to 'correct' the received [written record] version of events in the nineteenth century by recourse to oral traditions as expressed by present-day Indians." In a later study for Albany Government Law Review, Westerman writes of this dismissive view of oral history: "How is it that Dakota accounts and histories of the events leading to the war in 1862 are disregarded or discredited, or worse, put into competition with settler narratives as if there can be only one 'true' history? Often, the response is because they are not written down."

Historian Bruce M. White was chosen by the TRCDC in 2007 for his "widely published and respected" writing on Ojibwe history in Minnesota and treaty analysis. White's mother was a historian, and he grew up locally and abroad surrounded by historians, including those who worked with the Minnesota Historical Society. Growing up abroad, White said, taught him to be a respectful guest while living on the land of Minnesota's Native people. White had previously collaborated with the Mendota Mdewakanton Dakota Tribal Community to protect the sacred area surrounding their community known as Bdóte (explained in Mni Sota Makoce) and served as expert testimony on the hunting and fishing treaty rights of the Mille Lacs Band of Ojibwe in a case that succeeded in the Supreme Court of the United States. His scholarship and critique are acknowledged in North Country: The Making of Minnesota by author Mary Lethert Wingerd, a book published in 2010 resulting from a similar project to reexamine the popular narrative of Minnesota history. White is director of Turnstone Historical Research and received an Award of Merit from AASLH for his 2007 book We Are at Home: Pictures of the Ojibwe People published by the Minnesota Historical Society Press. Mni Sota Makoce was his second AASLH award. He married Ann Regan in 1984, who became editor-in-chief at MNHS Press. White's forthcoming book "They Would Not Be Moved" covers the Mille Lacs Band of Ojibwe's fight for the US to honor their treaty rights.

Gwen Westerman, director of English and humanities at Mankato State University, is also a poet, artist, and widely published author. She was chosen by TRCDC founding board member Floyd Westerman (Sisseton Wahpeton Oyate, her uncle), to serve as the Dakota perspective in partnership with White. Her art quilt is part of the cover design of Mni Sota Makoce. Westerman was inspired by author Heid E. Erdrich, author and musician Gordon Henry, painter Jim Denomie, scholar Amy Lonetree, Dakota culture holder and teacher Phyllis Joyce Redday-Roberts, and astrophysicist Neil Degrasse Tyson. Tyson especially inspires how Westerman relates Dakota star knowledge.

== Reception ==
Publishers Weekly profiled the book as "nuanced" and the research behind it as "intensive." CHOICE reviewed it as "excellent history" which is "highly recommended."

Star Tribune called it a "delicious hodgepodge of oral histories and written records" that represents a "breakthrough resource." Columnist for the Hibbing Daily Tribune Aaron Brown "heartily recommends" the book, particularly for its coverage of Dakota lifeways pre-contact. Chisago County Press explained the book as an insight on local history. WCCO News writer Robin Johnson included the book in a list of the best books about Minnesota because it "brilliantly intertwines generations of voices across cultures and geo-political landscapes." Calling it an "excellent introduction to a Dakota perspective on the history of the state of Minnesota," Insight News recommended the book for the City of Minneapolis's "Year of the Dakota." John Weiss of the Rochester Post Bulletin praises the book for providing the context missing from many U.S.–Dakota War narratives that makes "the conflict [make] much more sense."

Writing for her campaign The American Experiment and Star Tribune, conservative columnist Katherine Kersten condemned the book and characterized it as "misleading and politically driven 'stories.'" A later letter to the editor criticized Kersten's "black-and-white" perspective which dismisses how biases against Native people have shaped historical records.

Honoring Dakota, a project to unite the people of Prairie Island Indian Community and nearby Red Wing, Minnesota, recommends the book.

=== Academic ===
In American Indian Culture and Research Journal, Loyola University New Orleans professor Gregory O. Gagnon calls the book an "excellently presented synthesis of quite a bit of scholarship," which represents a "model for tribal studies," and recommends it for both researchers and general readers. Independent researcher Barbara W. Sommer in The Oral History Review praises the book's comparison of oral histories to primary documents and previously published history. Minitex, a Minnesota state library organization, notes the book's popularity in the organization's services and recommends it for all readers from "middle schoolers to research scholars." In an article for Middle West Review, James T. Spartz notes a lack of information about Southeast Minnesota, which is frequently absent from narratives about the state.

Mni Sota Makoce was included in Dictionary of Midwestern Literature Volume Two: Dimensions of the Midwestern Literary Imagination, which documents significant texts related to the Midwestern United States.

Paul Maravelas, author and researcher retained by the city of Eden Prairie to document the city's Native history, indicated that the project would be modeled off of Mni Sota Makoce: "Ideally this project would include a writer who would supply an Indigenous voice. [...] A splendid model is the book 'Mni Sota Makoce: The Land of the Dakota,' [...] Westerman provided a narrative from the Native perspective, and White provided a narrative from a white one."

Jameson Sweet (Lakota/Dakota) said in his critical review of the 2019 publication Lakota America: A New History of Indigenous Power (in which he calls Lakota America "irresponsible") that author Pekka Hämäläinen "largely reproduce[d]" the research of Mni Sota Makoce and the earlier landmark Dakota history Kinsmen of Another Kind by Gary Clayton Anderson.

=== Awards ===
- 2014 Hognander Minnesota History Award, part of the Minnesota Book Awards, a biennial award which recognizes the most outstanding work on Minnesota history
- 2013 Minnesota Book Awards, Minnesota category
- 2013 Award of Merit, part of the Leadership in History Awards from the American Association for State and Local History

==== Notable lists ====
- The Chronicle of Higher Education Weekly Book List, October 22, 2012
- Minnesota Department of Natural Resources Ojibwe and Dakota PLT Lessons, Supplemental resources
- Minnesota Department of Education Office of Indian Education, Indigenous Representations: Resources Aligned to Kindergarten − Grade 12 Minnesota Education Standards
- Understand Native Minnesota, an initiative of the Shakopee Mdewakanton Sioux Community, A Guide to Reliable Native American-Related Teaching Resources: With Reference to Minnesota K-12 Academic Standards in English Language Arts

== Editions ==
Mni Sota Makoce is also available in ebook format (ISBN 978-0-87351-883-3) and as a free online ebook (OCLC 1343048221). The book is also part of Minnesota State Services for the Blind accessibility-enhanced audiobook catalogue as a DAISY Digital Talking Book (OCLC 1349480741).

Shakopee Mdewakanton Sioux Community awarded a grant in 2024 to the Minnesota Historical Society Press to produce a young adult edition of Mni Sota Makoce for use in schools.

== See also ==
- Bdote Memory Map – Dakota-made interactive story map about sacred locations in Minnesota
