= Poet Laureate of Minnesota =

Official poet the U.S. state of Minnesota

- Incumbent; Gwen Westerman since 2021
- Type: Poet laureate
- Appointer: Governor of Minnesota
- Formation: 1934 (officially in 2007)
- First holder: Margarette Ball Dickson
- Salary: None

The poet laureate of Minnesota is the poet laureate for the U.S. state of Minnesota.

The poet laureate attends public events and is expected to celebrate Minnesota's cultural history, engaging the youth and marginalized voices in poetry. According to the office of the governor, the poet laureate "may promote the reading and writing of poetry, preside over poetry awards and contests and write poetry or select poets to compose works for significant state occasions."

== History ==
Following the foundation of the League of Minnesota Poets in 1934, Margarette Ball Dickson was named Minnesota's first poet laureate by the national Poet Laureate League. A letter she received from the governor recognized her appointment. In 1973, local media announced the election of a new poet laureate. Columnist Abe Altrowitz, designated Minnesota commissioner of poetry by the governor, named Laurene Tibbetts-Larson as Minnesota's poet laureate on May 14, 1974.

Legislation to make the poet laureate position official was introduced on February 19, 1974, but did not pass. Further bills to create an official poet laureate were introduced on April 1, 2004, and February 4, 2005, but were also unsuccessful. In his veto of the latter bill, Governor Tim Pawlenty, noted that "Even though we have a state 'folklorist,' I also have concern this will lead to calls for other similar positions. We could also see requests for a state mime, interpretive dancer or potter."

The official position of poet laureate of Minnesota was established on May 25, 2007. Robert Bly was appointed Minnesota poet laureate on February 27, 2008. He was succeeded by Joyce Sutphen on August 23, 2011. Sutphen relinquished the position in April 2021. Governor Tim Walz and Lieutenant Governor Peggy Flanagan appointed Gwen Westerman as poet laureate of Minnesota on September 9, 2021.

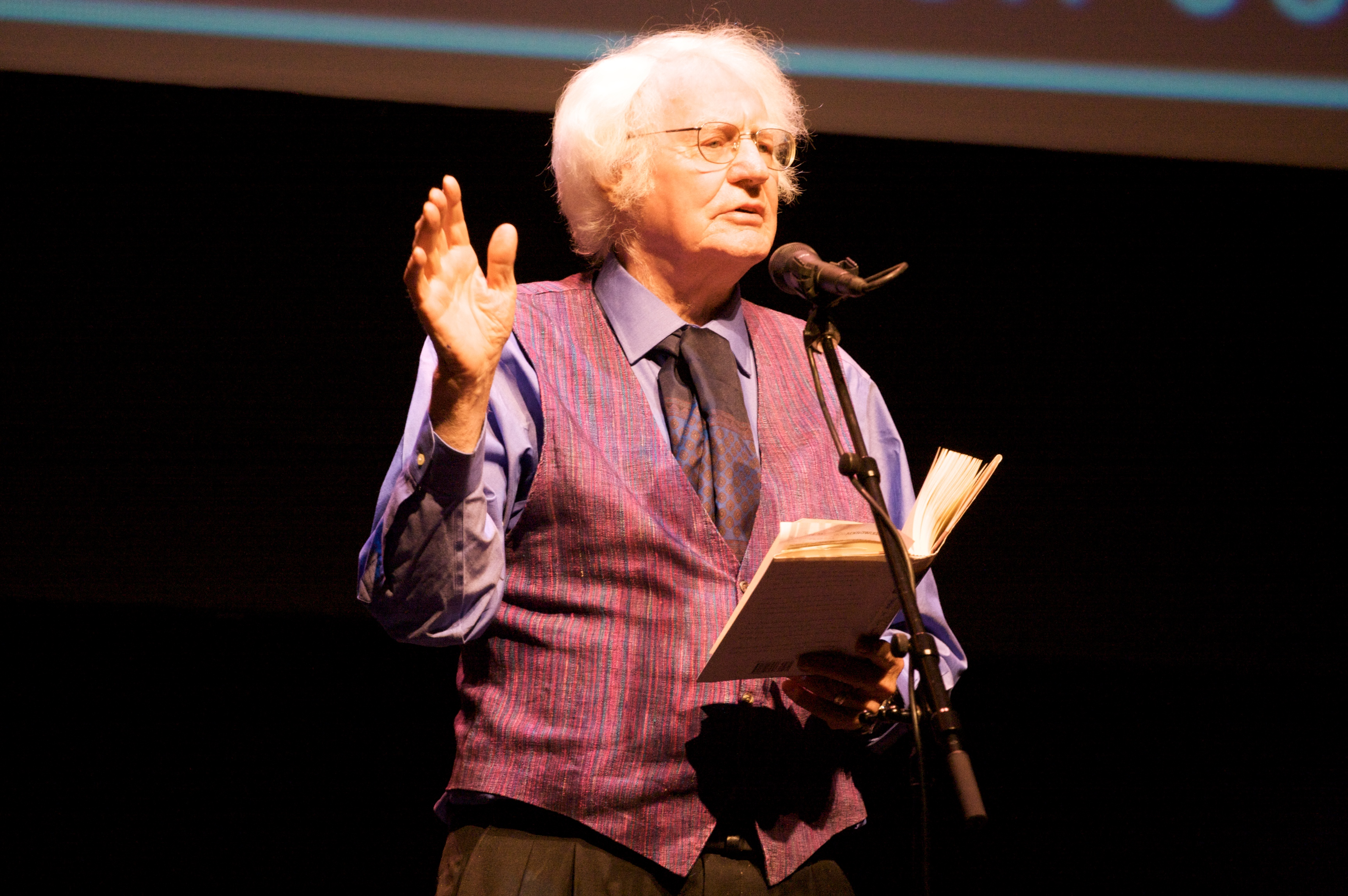
Robert Bly was appointed poet laureate in 2008.

== List of poets laureate ==
#	Poet laureate	Term began	Term ended	Appointed by	Notes
1	Margarette Ball Dickson	1934	July 21, 1963	Poet Laureate League (District of Columbia)	
2	Laurene Tibbetts-Larson	May 14, 1974	December 6, 1999	unofficial election	
3	Robert Bly	February 27, 2008	August 22, 2011	Gov. Tim Pawlenty	
4	Joyce Sutphen	August 23, 2011	April 2021	Gov. Tim Pawlenty	
5	Gwen Westerman	September 9, 2021	Present	Gov. Tim Walz	
