= Boudreaux and Thibodeaux =

Genre of joke

Boudreaux and Thibodeaux, also known as Boudreau and Thibodeau, are jokes which make fun of slow-witted Cajuns. These jokes are a common tradition to the Southern Louisiana region and often feature an exaggerated Cajun accent. Some of the jokes can be very vulgar. They have a history of social sharing and not all are written down in text.

== History ==
Boudreaux and Thibodeaux are two fictional but humorous characters from Southern Louisiana experiencing life's trials and tribulations. Boudreaux has a wife named Marie and a dog named Phideaux, and Thibodeaux has a wife named Clotile. Similar jokes can be found with Ole and Lena jokes mocking Minnesotans, Akpos jokes mocking Nigerians, and also Zeke and Zeb jokes mocking Midwesterners. Some jokes can be just a few sentences long, while others much more involved and greater in length.

=== Examples ===
- "When Boudreaux got home yesterday, Clotile ran out to him saying, "The car's got water in the carburetor!", "How you know that, you?", "Cause it's parked in the Bayou!""
- "Boudreaux was walking down the wharf and he met up with Thibodeaux. He says to Thibodeaux, "Hey podna, how y'all are?" Thibodaux says, "Mais, OK." Boudreaux says, "And how's your wife?" Thibodeaux says, "Mais, my wife's an angel." Boudreaux says, "You lucky, my wife's still living!""

== See also ==
- Little Johnny
- Nasreddin
