= Ole and Lena =

Fictional characters in jokes

Ole and Lena (also Sven and Ole) are central characters in jokes by Scandinavian Americans, particularly in the Upper Midwest region of the United States. These include the Upper Peninsula of Michigan, Minnesota, Wisconsin, Iowa, South Dakota and North Dakota, where Scandinavian immigrant traditions are common.

== Format ==
Ole and Lena jokes can be long and drawn-out stories, or as short as two or three sentences. Lena is typically portrayed as the smarter of the two, often explaining where Ole went wrong in his misadventures. Another common character is Sven, who usually shows up in jokes along with Ole, making Sven and Ole jokes, though all three may appear together. Sven isn't as bright as Ole and Lena, but he means well. Ole and Lena are typically Norwegian, and Sven and his wife are Swedish. In Michigan's U.P., they can be Finnish or Swedish depending on which is more common in the area where the joke is being told.

=== Examples ===
- Ole and Sven are at a funeral. Suddenly it occurs to Ole that he doesn't remember the name of the dearly departed. Ole turns to Sven and asks: "Sven, could you remind me again who died?" Sven thinks for a moment and says, "I'm not sure," Sven points at the casket, "...but I think it was de guy in de box."
- Ole and Sven are out deer hunting. Ole bags a buck. After they dress the deer and tag it, they grab it by its hind legs and start dragging through the woods back to the car. A game warden happens on the pair and, after checking their tags and admiring the buck tells them that they are dragging the deer out all wrong. By dragging it by the rear legs, the snow, leaves and dirt are getting caught by the animal's fur, and the horns are getting all tangled in the brush. The warden suggests that they drag it by the front legs. They agree to try it and much to their surprise, it is much easier dragging the deer this way. After a half-hour of this Sven turns to Ole and says, "Boy dat game warden was right, it sure is easier dragging de deer dis way, but ya know, we are getting further away from de car."
- Ole went to the Sons of Norway Hall one night and finally won the door prize, which was a toilet brush. He was so excited that he won he brought it home and used it often. Someone asked him during the next meeting what the prize was and if he liked it or not. Ole replied, "Yea I like the toilet brush, but I think I'm gonna go back to using paper."
- Ole goes out one day to use the outhouse, and he finds Sven there. Sven has his wallet out, and he's throwing money down into the hole of the outhouse. Ole asks, "Uff da! Sven, watcha doin' there, fella? You're throwing the five dollar bill and the ten dollar bill down into the hole of the outhouse! Whatcha doin' that for?" Sven answers, "Well, when I pulled up my trousers I dropped a nickel down there—and I'm not going down into that mess for just a nickel!"
- Sven and Ole are roofing a house. Ole picks a nail out of the pan, examines it, and with a "nope" tosses it over his shoulder, picks up another one does the same thing, picks up a third and after examining it uses it to nail in the shingle. Sven seeing all of this exclaims, "Ole! what the hell are you doing, wasting nails like that?" Ole replies, "Well you see, those nails they're pointing towards the house, I can use them. But these nails... they're pointing away from the house, they're useless." "Ole you IDIOT!!" Sven replies, "those nails aren't something you just throw 'way willy nilly... those nails are for the other side of the house."
- Ole is on his deathbed. The doctor has told him he has only a few hours to live. He catches the scent of his favorite bars wafting through the air. With all the strength he can muster, he drags himself into the kitchen and sees a fresh pan cooling on the rack. He cuts one out and bites into the scrumptious cookie. Lena comes in, smacks his hand, and says, "Shame on you, Ole! Dese are for after de funeral!"

Many of the jokes are bawdy:

- Sven and Ole go to Fargo and visit a brothel. A woman says she will have sex with both of them for $20, but insists, "You have to use rubbers 'cause I don't want to get pregnant." They agree. Back on the farm, a week later, Sven says, "Hey, Ole, remember that girl we met in Fargo?" "You betcha, why?" "Well, I been thinking I don't give a damn whether she gets pregnant or not." "Me neither." "Well, let's take dese damn tings off, then."
- Sven is late for work. The boss finds him in the bunkhouse, and Sven explains that he has an erection and can't get his overalls on. "OK, Sven, you need to go in the barn and get a shovel full of nice hot horse manure and pack it around there. That'll take down the swelling and you can come on and get to work." Sven goes to the barn and open his fly and gets the shovel full of manure ready. At that moment, the boss's wife walks in. "What the hell are you doing, Sven?" Sven explains what he is doing. "Yumping Yeesus, Sven, don't do that, stick it in here!" (She pulls up her dress). "What?" says Sven. "The whole shovelful?"
- Ole wakes up one morning, remembering that it's his and Lena's 25th wedding anniversary. Ole punches Lena in the arm. Lena awakes and asks, "What was that for?" Ole says, "That's for 25 years of bad sex!" Lena then punches Ole in the arm. Ole asks, "Why did you hit me?" Lena says, "That's for knowing the difference!"

== Depictions ==
The Arvegods sculpture at Concordia College in Moorhead, Minnesota is commonly referred to as Ole and Lena.

== See also ==
- Boudreaux and Thibodeaux
- Uff da

== Other sources ==
In addition to the Prairie Home Companion joke books, there are various collections in print under the name of editor Red Stangland.
