= Kao Kalia Yang =

American writer (born 1980)

- Born: December 1980 (age 45); Ban Vinai Refugee Camp, Pak Chom district of Loei province, Thailand
- Education: Carleton College (BA); Columbia University (MFA)
- Occupation: Author
- Writing career
- Years active: 2009–present
- Genres: Memoir; picture books
- Subjects: Hmong American culture and history
- Notable works: The Latehomecomer: A Hmong Family Memoir; The Song Poet
- Website: kaokaliayang.com

Kao Kalia Yang (born 1980) is a Hmong American writer and author of The Latehomecomer: A Hmong Family Memoir from Coffee House Press and The Song Poet from Metropolitan Press. Her work has appeared in the Paj Ntaub Voice Hmong literary journal, "Waterstone~Review," and other publications. She is a contributing writer to On Being's Public Theology Reimagined blog. Additionally, Yang wrote the lyric documentary, The Place Where We Were Born. Yang currently resides in St. Paul, Minnesota.

== Early life ==
Born in Ban Vinai Refugee Camp in December, 1980, Yang came to Minnesota in the summer of 1987, along with her parents and older sister Dawb. Yang says that the move to America was necessary for her parents. Her mother suffered six miscarriages after giving birth to her, and with no male heir, her father was being pressured to find a second wife. He even took his younger daughter on trips with him to visit eligible women in the camp. For Yang's parents, leaving Ban Vinai was not only about finding opportunity for their two daughters, but also rescuing themselves from family and cultural pressure. Yang says that while her sister mastered the English language quickly, she struggled for many years, finally discovering that her gift lay not in the spoken, but in the written word. Yang credits her older sister Dawb, with awakening an interest within her:

[E]verything was a Chinese movie in her head. So she would read Jack and the Beanstalk ... [and] it became a Chinese drama. So in my head it was never Jack and the Beanstalk; it wasn't even Jack, it was a Chinese drama, flying around. That beanstalk wasn't a beanstalk, it was a mountain, and he was going to get this beautiful flower that would make his ailing mother live for a hundred years. And this is the kind of introduction I had to books.

Yang also credits her 9th grade English teacher, Mrs. Gallatin, with recognizing and encouraging her talents. Upon graduation from Harding High School, she attended Carleton College, though she was by no means certain of her future plans when she began her college career.

== Education ==
Yang graduated from Carleton College in 2003 with a bachelor's degree in American Studies, Women's and Gender Studies, and Cross-cultural Studies. Yang received her Master's of Fine Arts in Creative Nonfiction Writing from Columbia University in New York City. Her graduate studies were supported by a Dean's Fellowship from the School of the Arts and The Paul & Daisy Soros Fellowships for New Americans.

Beginning at age 12, Yang taught English as a second language to adult refugees. As a student, Yang privately tutored students, and taught creative nonfiction writing workshops to professionals, including professors from Rutgers University and New York University. Yang has also taught the fundamentals of writing to students at Concordia University in St. Paul and courses in composition at St. Catherine University. She was a professor in the English department at the University of Wisconsin-Eau Claire for the 2010–2011 academic year. In 2014, Yang served as a mentor for the Loft Mentor Series. She taught at North Hennepin Community College in 2015 as visiting faculty in the English Department. Recently, Yang was the Benedict Distinguished Visiting Faculty in American Studies and English at Carleton College.

== Works ==
=== Memoir ===
- Yang, Kao Kalia (2017). The Latehomecomer: A Hmong Family Memoir. La Vergne: Coffee House Press. ISBN 978-1-56689-478-4.
- Yang, Kao Kalia (May 9, 2017). The Song Poet. Picador. ISBN 978-1-250-13188-1.
- Gibney, Shannon; Yang, Kao Kalia, eds. (2019-10-15). What God Is Honored Here?. Minneapolis: University of Minnesota Press. ISBN 978-1-5179-0793-8.
- Yang, Kao Kalia (2020-02-04). Somewhere in the Unknown World. New York: Metropolitan Books. ISBN 978-1-250-29685-6.
- Yang, Kao Kalia (March 19, 2024). Where Rivers Part. New York: Simon and Schuster. ISBN 978-1-9821-8529-9.

=== Chapters ===
- Yang, Kao Kalia (September 28, 2021). "Battlegrounds and Building Grounds". We Are Meant to Rise. Minneapolis: University of Minnesota Press. ISBN 978-1-5179-1221-5.

=== Picture books ===
- Yang, Kao Kalia; Kim, Seo (2019). A Map into the World. Minneapolis: Lerner Publishing Group. ISBN 978-1-5415-3836-8.
- Yang, Kao Kalia; Le, Khoa (2020). The Most Beautiful Thing. Minneapolis, MN: Carolrhoda Books. ISBN 978-1-5415-6191-5. OCLC 1135588170.
- Yang, Kao Kalia; Reiter, Xee (2020). The Shared Room. Minneapolis, MN: University of Minnesota Press. ISBN 978-1-5179-0794-5. OCLC 1122909864.
- Yang, Kao Kalia; Thao, Billy (2021). Yang Warriors. Minneapolis: University of Minnesota Press. ISBN 978-1-5179-0798-3. OCLC 1201298966.
- Yang, Kao Kalia; Wada, Rachel (2021). From the Tops of the Trees. Minneapolis: Carolrhoda Books. ISBN 978-1-5415-8130-2.
- Yang, Kao Kalia; Lin, Jiemei (2024). The Rock in My Throat. Minneapolis: Carolrhoda Books. ISBN 978-1-7284-4568-7. OCLC 1382289719.
- Yang, Kao Kalia; Vue, Khou (2024). Caged. New York: Kokila. ISBN 978-1-9848-1636-8. OCLC 1404818587.
- Yang, Kao Kalia; Phachanh, Wravong (2024). The Year the Cold Didn't Come. International Fund for Agricultural Development.

=== Young adult literature ===
- Yang, Kao Kalia (September 17, 2024). The Diamond Explorer. New York: Penguin. ISBN 978-1-9848-1633-7.

== Awards and recognition ==
Kao Kalia Yang has been a recipient of the Alan Page Scholarship, the Gilman International Award, and the Freeman in Asia Scholarship.

Yang was a Columbia University's School of the Arts Dean's fellow, a Paul and Daisy Soros fellow, and a McKnight Arts fellow.

Yang won the 2005 Lantern Book's essay contest for an essay titled "To the Men In My Family Who Love Chickens."

In 2008, Carleton College awarded her with the Spirit of Carleton College Award.

Yang has been the recipient of several Minnesota State Arts Board artist grants.

In 2009 her first book The Latehomecomer won Minnesota Book Awards for memoir/creative nonfiction as well as the Reader's Choice Award—the first book to ever win two awards in the same year. The book was a finalist for a PEN USA Literary Center Award and an Asian American Literary Award. The book remains a bestselling title for Coffee House Press. "The Latehomecomer" is a National Endowment of the Arts' Big Read book.

Yang's second book, The Song Poet, is the winner of the 2017 MN Book Award in Creative Nonfiction/Memoir. It was a finalist for the National Book Critics Circle Award and the Chautauqua Prize. The book is now a finalist for a PEN USA literary award in nonfiction and the Dayton's Literary Peace Prize.

In 2020 Yang's children's book A Map into the World, illustrated by Seo Kim, received a Charlotte Zolotow Award Honor for outstanding writing in a picture book.

In 2023, her picture book From the Tops of the Trees won the Asian/Pacific American Awards for Literature. In 2025, The Rock In My Throat received the Picture Book Honor Title from the Asian/Pacific American Awards for Literature and a Minnesota Book Award for Children's Literature. Also in 2025, a Minnesota Book Award was awarded to Where Rivers Part: A Story of My Mother's Life in Memoir and Creative Nonfiction and The Diamond Explorer in Middle Grade Literature.

== Controversies ==
On September 24, 2012, Radiolab aired a segment on yellow rain and the Hmong people, during which Robert Krulwich interviewed Yang and her uncle Eng Yang. During the two-hour interview, of which less than five minutes was aired, Yang was brought to the point of tears over "Robert's harsh dismissal of my uncle's experience."

Following a public outcry, Krulwich issued an apology on September 30 writing, "I now can hear that my tone was oddly angry. That's not acceptable -- especially when talking to a man who has suffered through a nightmare in Southeast Asia that was beyond horrific."

The podcast itself was later amended on October 5, and according to Yang "On October 7, I received an email from Dean Cappello, the Chief Content Officer at WNYC, notifying me that Radiolab had once more "amended" the Yellow Rain podcast so that Robert could apologize at the end, specifically to Uncle Eng for the harshness of his tone and to me for saying that I was trying to "monopolize" the conversation. I listened to the doctored version. In addition to Robert's apologies—which completely failed to acknowledge the dismissal of our voices and the racism that transpired/s -- Radiolab had simply re-contextualized their position, taken out the laughter at the end, and "cleaned" away incriminating evidence."

Yang noted in particular: "Everybody in the show had a name, a profession, institutional affiliation except Eng Yang, who was identified as "Hmong guy," and me, "his niece." The fact that I am an award-winning writer was ignored. The fact that my uncle was an official radio man and documenter of the Hmong experience to the Thai government during the war was absent."

This incident stirred up issues of white privilege, with many accusing Radiolab and Krulwich of being insensitive to racial matters.

== Sources ==
- 2005 Lantern Books Interview With Kao Kalia Yang
- Interview with Kao Kalia Yang by Peter Shea
- Where Rivers Part : A Story of My Mother's Life, published by Simon and Schuster
