= MISFITS =

MiSFiTS was the acronym for the Minnesota Society for Interest in Science Fiction and Fantasy. This organization has now changed its name to GPS, an acronym for Geek Partnership Society. It was founded in 1999 and was the parent non-profit organization for the CONvergence speculative fiction convention. Geek Partnership Society (formerly MISFITS) and CONvergence separated their organizations effective January 1, 2010. GPS sponsors events and clubs year round including the Team Trivia Challenge, a Writing Contest, Read-the-Book/See-the-Movie, and various other social clubs for the Minneapolis/St. Paul fandom community.

In 2010 GPS will be opening the first geek community center with event and meeting space for events related to science-fiction, fantasy and other "geeky" topics.
