= Morgan Creek Vineyards (Alabama) =

Winery in Alabama

- Location: Harpersville, Alabama, United States
- Coordinates: 33.326156°N 86.4555°W
- Founded: 2000
- Cases/yr: 15,000
- Known for: Vulcan Red
- Distribution: Regional
- Tasting: Open to public
- Website: Official website

Morgan Creek Vineyards is a winery in Harpersville, Alabama, United States. Regionally well-known, it is one of eleven wineries in the state. Founded in 2000 on an initial 30 acres (12 ha), it began with a production of 600 cases (7200 bottles), that sold in 6 stores. In 2009, the winery produced 15,000 cases, selling in 400 stores across Alabama and Mississippi, and expanded its acreage by 85 acres (34 ha). It is run by Brammer family.

Morgan Creek produces "Southern wines such as muscadine, blueberry and apple," and a red wine called "Vulcan Red," named for the Vulcan statue in nearby Birmingham. Its wine was included on the list of "100 Things to Eat in Alabama Before You Die."

As a member of the Alabama Wineries and Grape Growers Association, Morgan Creek has been actively involved in efforts to relax some restrictions on wineries in Alabama, to better conform with laws in the rest of the United States. In 2010, it favored the passage of Alabama House Bill 637 and Alabama Senate Bill 556, collectively known as the Alabama Small Winery Business Viability Act, in the Alabama legislature. The act, if passed, would require Alabama wineries to conform with Federal winery laws, define what a small winery is, and address business issues related to wineries.
