= Gwen Westerman =

Native American poet, educator, and artist from Minnesota

Gwen Westerman PhD
- Education: Oklahoma State University, BA and MA; University of Kansas, PhD
- Occupations: poet, educator, and artist
- Spouse: Glenn Wasicuna
- Writing career
- Language: Dakota, English
- Genre: poetry
- Website: gwenwesterman.com

Gwen Nell Westerman is a Native American educator, writer, and fiber artist.

She is a professor at Minnesota State University, Mankato, and the Director of the Native American Literature Symposium. Governor Tim Walz appointed her as Poet Laureate of Minnesota in September 2021.

== Background ==
Westerman is Dakota and Cherokee. She is an enrolled citizen of both the Sisseton-Wahpeton Oyate of the Lake Traverse Reservation and the Cherokee Nation. She speaks the Dakota language. Her mother was Cherokee, and Westerman grew up in Kansas.

Her husband was the late Glenn Wasicuna, who was a professor and advocate of the Dakota language. Together, they appeared in documentaries, and served as members of the Indian Advisory Committee for the Minnesota Historical Society.

== Career ==
Westerman earned her bachelor's and master's degrees in English from Oklahoma State University. She received a doctoral degree in English from the University of Kansas. She worked in corporate communications for several years before beginning work at MSU. Today, she is a professor of English and director of the humanities program at Minnesota State University, Mankato.

Westerman is a successful author. She was co-author of the book Mni Sota Makoce: The Land of the Dakota, which won two Minnesota Book Awards. She has published poetry written in both English and Dakota, such as in her collection Follow the Blackbirds. In 2022, she received an Academy of American Poets Laureate Fellowship.

== Fiber arts ==
Westerman is a fiber artist who specializes in quilt-making. She has served as an artist-in-residence at the Great Plains Art Museum and the Minnesota Historical Society. She also has work in the permanent collections of the aforementioned museums, along with the University Art Galleries at the University of South Dakota and the Children's Museum of Southern Minnesota.

== Awards ==
- 1999: Native American Inroads, The Loft, Minneapolis, Minnesota. Mentor: Diane Glancy (American).
- 1999: Native American Inroads, The Loft, Minneapolis, Minnesota. Mentor: Mona Susan Power (Standing Rock Dakota).
- 2004: Fellowship, Smithsonian Institution, National Museum of Natural History, American Indian Programs. Research project: Traditional Dakota beadwork, under the direction of JoAllyn Archambault, PhD (Standing Rock Sioux).
- 2012: Douglas R. Moore Research Award Fellow. Minnesota State University, Mankato.
- 2012: Presidential Teaching Scholar, Minnesota State, Mankato.
- 2013: Minnesota Book Award, Minnesota Category.
- 2013: Leadership in History Award, American Association for State and Local History.
- 2014: Hognander Minnesota History Award
- 2014: Distinguished Faculty Scholar, Minnesota State University, Mankato.
- 2015: Native American Artist in Residence at the Minnesota Historical Society

== Publications ==
=== Books ===
- Westerman, Gwen; White, Bruce (2012). Mni Sota Makoce: The Land of the Dakota. St. Paul: Minnesota Historical Society Press. ISBN 978-0873518697.
- Westerman, Gwen Neil (2013). Follow the Blackbirds. American Indian Studies. East Lansing: Michigan State University Press. ISBN 978-1611860924.
- Gwen Nell Westerman (2023). Songs, Blood Deep. Holy Cow! Press.

=== Articles and chapters ===
- Westerman, Gwen (2009). "Generosity in Continuance: The Gifts of Simon J. Ortiz". In Brill de Ramirez, Susan Berry; Lucero, Evelina (eds.). Simon J. Ortiz: A Poetic Legacy of Indigenous Continuance. Albuquerque: University of New Mexico Press. pp. 177–182. ISBN 978-0826339881.
- Westerman, Gwen (2009). "George Shiras, III". In Cevasco, George A.; Harmond, Richard P. (eds.). Modern American Environmentalists: A Biographical Encyclopedia. Baltimore: Johns Hopkins University Press. pp. 470–472. ISBN 978-0801891526.
- Westerman, Gwen (September 14, 2009). "Going Back". A View from the Loft. The Loft Literary Center.
- Westerman, Gwen (2012). "Sister Lost, Sister Found: Redemption in Louise Erdrich's The Painted Drum and Shadow Tag". In Hafen, P. Jane (ed.). Critical Insights: Louise Erdrich. Ipswich, MA: Salem Press. pp. 245–255. ISBN 978-1429837231.
- Westerman, Gwen (2013). "She Wore a Yellow Ribbon". In Howe, LeAnne; Markowitz, Harvey; Cummings, Denise (eds.). Seeing Red—Hollywood's Pixeled Skins: American Indians and Film. East Lansing: Michigan State University Press. pp. 25–29. ISBN 978-1611860818.

=== Poetry ===
- "Dakota Odowaŋ". Yellow Medicine Review. 1 (1): 133–134. Spring 2007.
- "He keya Wo'okiye". Yellow Medicine Review. 1 (1): 135. Spring 2007.
- "Dakota Odowaŋ". Water-Stone Review. 13: 141–142. 2010.
- "Wowicak'u/Feed Them". Water-Stone Review. 13: 143. 2010.
- "Root Words". Natural Bridge. 26: 1. Fall 2011.
- "Where the Buffalo Roam". Natural Bridge. 26: 2–3. Fall 2011.
- "Awakening". Natural Bridge. 26: 4. Fall 2011.
- "Song for the Generations". Water-Stone Review. 15: 148–149. 2012.

=== Art ===
- "Caske's Pardon 2012". Ded Uŋk'uŋpi—We Are Here (Exhibit Catalog). All My Relations Gallery and James J. Hill House Gallery. 2012.
- "Mitakuye Owas (All My Relations)". Hena Uŋkiksuyapi: In Commemoration of the Dakota Mass Execution of 1862 (Exhibit Catalog). Hillstrom Museum of Art. 2012.
