= The Song Poet =

- Author: Kao Kalia Yang
- Genre: Memoir
- Publisher: Metropolitan Press
- Publication date: 2016
- Awards: Minnesota Book Award (2017)

The Song Poet is a 2016 memoir by Kao Kalia Yang, published by Metropolitan Press. It won the MN Book Award in creative nonfiction/memoir and was a finalist for both the National Book Critics Circle Award and the Chautauqua Prize.
