= League of Minnesota Poets =

Poetry association in Minnesota, US

- Established: 1934
- Type: Poetry organization
- Location: Minneapolis, Minnesota
- Website: www.mnpoets.org

The League of Minnesota Poets (LMP) is a non-profit state-level poetry association in the U.S. state of Minnesota, which is affiliated with the National Federation of State Poetry Societies (NFSPS). The organization conducts monthly and annual contests, promotes poetry, publishes poetry books and organizes periodic meetings, workshops and festivals.

== History ==
Moccasin literary poetry journal, 1945

In 1933 Minnesota poets Robert Cary and Irl Morse began published Poetry of Today, a column in the St. Paul Pioneer Press with the goal of generating interest in a state poetry society. The effort was successful, and on February 10, 1934, a group of poets met at the Lowry Hotel in St. Paul and established the League of Minnesota Poets. By the end of the year, there were 74 members. The organization incorporated as a 501(c)(3) nonprofit in 2014.

In 1935 the society held the first non-member poetry contest and published the first collection of poetry from the membership, titled Year Book. The group began publishing the quarterly Moccasin bulletin with news and event information, but in 1936 this was converted into a literary poetry magazine, and the group inaugurated the LOMPlighter newsletter to replace the bulletin. In 1982 the LMP ratified a proposal to name a Poet Laureate with a five year term.

According to a 2006 article in the Mankato Free Press an effort was made by the Mankato chapter of the League of Minnesota Poets to revive the custom of holding a local Eisteddfod, a Welsh literary and cultural festival with adjudicated competitions for poets, writers, musicians, and others. The tradition, which had been brought to the Mankato area in the 1860s by early Welsh-American pioneers, had fallen into abeyance during the 1950s. During the 2006 Cambria Eisteddfod, however, at the Morgan Creek Vineyards in New Ulm, Brainerd poet Doris Stengel was awarded the Bardic Chair by Archdruid John Calvin Rezmerski.

But, following Rezmerski's death in 2016, the custom of Eisteddfodau in Minnesota again fell into abeyance.

== Activities ==
The League hosts an annual contest cycle, and distributes cash prizes for winning poems. The organization also sponsors events, meeting and conferences related to poetry and poetry-writing. In 2020 the LMP sponsored a Pandemic Penpal Poetry Project to connect poets with residents in congregate living who were cut off from visitors by quarantine requirements.
