= Stangeland (surname) =

Stangeland is a locational surname of Norwegian origin, which means a person from one of several places called Stangeland in Norway. A related name is Stangland. The name may refer to:

- Arlan Stangeland (1930–2013), American politician
- Jim Stangeland (1921–2014), American football player and coach
- Magnus Stangeland (born 1941), Norwegian politician
- Trygve Stangeland (1934–2011), Norwegian businessman
