= Lifeway =

Sociological term for Native American ways of life

Lifeway is a term describing a method of living, with specific uses in the disciplines of anthropology, sociology and archeology, particularly in North America.

== History ==
=== Literature ===
From the mid 19th century, the word was used with the meaning 'way through life' or 'way of life'. It appears, for example, in literary contexts in the stories of Clara Lee and Rose Porter, in the verse of Frank L. Stanton, and in editor and politician Edgar Howard's opinion pieces on other political figures.

=== Anthropology and archeology ===
Dr. Arthur C. Parker, American archaeologist of Seneca and Scots-English descent, was one of the earliest to use the term in reference to Native American ways of life, saying in an article published by the Binghamton Press in 1930, "Our key to the future is locked in the life-ways of our Indian predecessors". Use of the term in anthropology was established with the publication of Morris Edward Opler's 1941 study An Apache Life-Way: The Economic, Social, and Religious Institutions of the Chiricahua Indians.
Recent explanations of the term in the field of Native American and other Indigenous studies "suggest the close interaction of worldview and economy in small-scale societies". The word 'lifeway' "emphasizes the road of life as indigenous people see it. Such a perspective can be associated with the concept "worldview," a distinct way of thinking about the cosmos and of evaluating life's actions in terms of those views", and focuses on "an interpretive effort to express indigenous understandings of human-earth relations as an interactive and pervasive context that outsiders might label religion."

=== Sociology ===
The field of sociology also adopted the word 'lifeway', with one sociologist explaining that "the definition of status differences and the conceptualization of lifeway patterns ... reflect the central significant of economic referents;" "each lifeway pattern would appear .. as a linked values system [which] ... would exhibit customs, sanctions, habits, and meanings". Urban as well as rural lifeways could be analysed and described (for example, a 1950 thesis on A Sociological Analysis of the Chicago Skid Row Lifeway).

== See also ==
- Lifestyle
- Folkways
