= Uff da =

Scandinavian exclamation expressing dismay

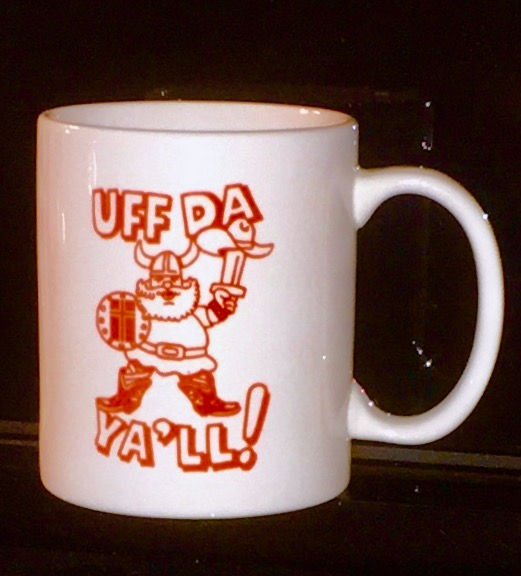
Norwegian-Texan mug

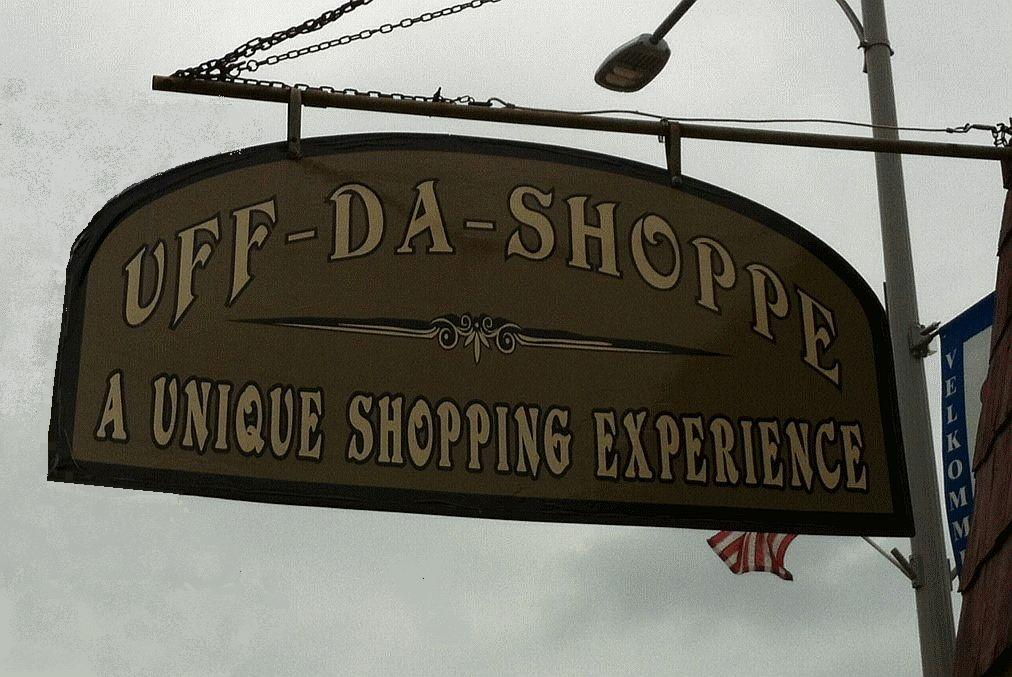
Uff Da Shoppe in Westby, Wisconsin, US

Uff da (/ˈʊfdə/; sometimes also spelled oof-da, oofda, oofala, oof-dah, oofdah, huffda, uff-da, uffda, uff-dah, ufda, ufdah, or uf daa) is a Scandinavian exclamation or interjection used to express dismay, typically upon hearing bad news.

Of Norwegian origin, the phrase was brought to the United States by Scandinavian Americans specifically to the Upper Midwest, New England, and Pacific Northwest regions of the United States during the 19th century, where its meaning was broadened to express also surprise, astonishment, exhaustion, or relief.

== Danish and Norwegian usage ==
In Danish and Norwegian language, uf (Danish and older Norwegian spelling) or uff (current Norwegian spelling) is a mild and polite vernacular interjection used when something is unpleasant, uncomfortable, hurtful, annoying, sad, or irritating. The word is an onomatopoeia corresponding to English oof, Dutch oef and German uff. Other similar interjections exist in Danish, e.g. uha or føj, and Norwegian, e.g. huff. Uff da may be used in Norwegian as a response when hearing something lamentable (but not too serious), and can be translated as "Oh, I'm sorry to hear that". Da is derived from Old Norse þá meaning 'then' in this context (similar to e.g. the response "ok, then"); both da and English then (from Old English þanne, þænne, þonne) are derived from Proto-Germanic *þan ('at that (time), then'). The Swedish exclamations ojdå and usch då are similar in meaning, with Swedish då corresponding to Norwegian da. Uff is a Swedish word with the same meaning as the Norwegian word, it is documented in writing from 1770.

== North American usage ==
Uff da is a marker of Scandinavian heritage, predominantly heard in the upper Midwest, which has a significant population with Scandinavian roots. It also is used throughout the Pacific Northwest, particularly in the Washington city of Stanwood and the Seattle neighborhood of Ballard. Its variety of meanings let it substitute for common obscenities.

It has also been applied to places and events, such as:

- Uff-Da Airport, located in Stoughton, Wisconsin.
- Uffda Fest!, an annual event held in Spring Grove, Minnesota.
- Uff Da Days, an annual event held in Ostrander, Minnesota.
- Uffda Day Fall Festival, an annual event held in Rutland, North Dakota.
- The Uff-Da Shoppe, located in Stanwood, Washington.
- Uff Da! Sign Store, located in Wausau, Wisconsin.

=== Jazz age slang ===
"Oofta" has been used as a pejorative verb, noun and adjective that was originated by Black jazz musicians in the first half of the 20th century. Having "oofta" implied that a Black performer or group was playing to appease white audiences. Ossie Davis admitted to documentarian Ken Burns in 2000 that some musicians had labeled the immensely popular Louis Armstrong as "oofta."

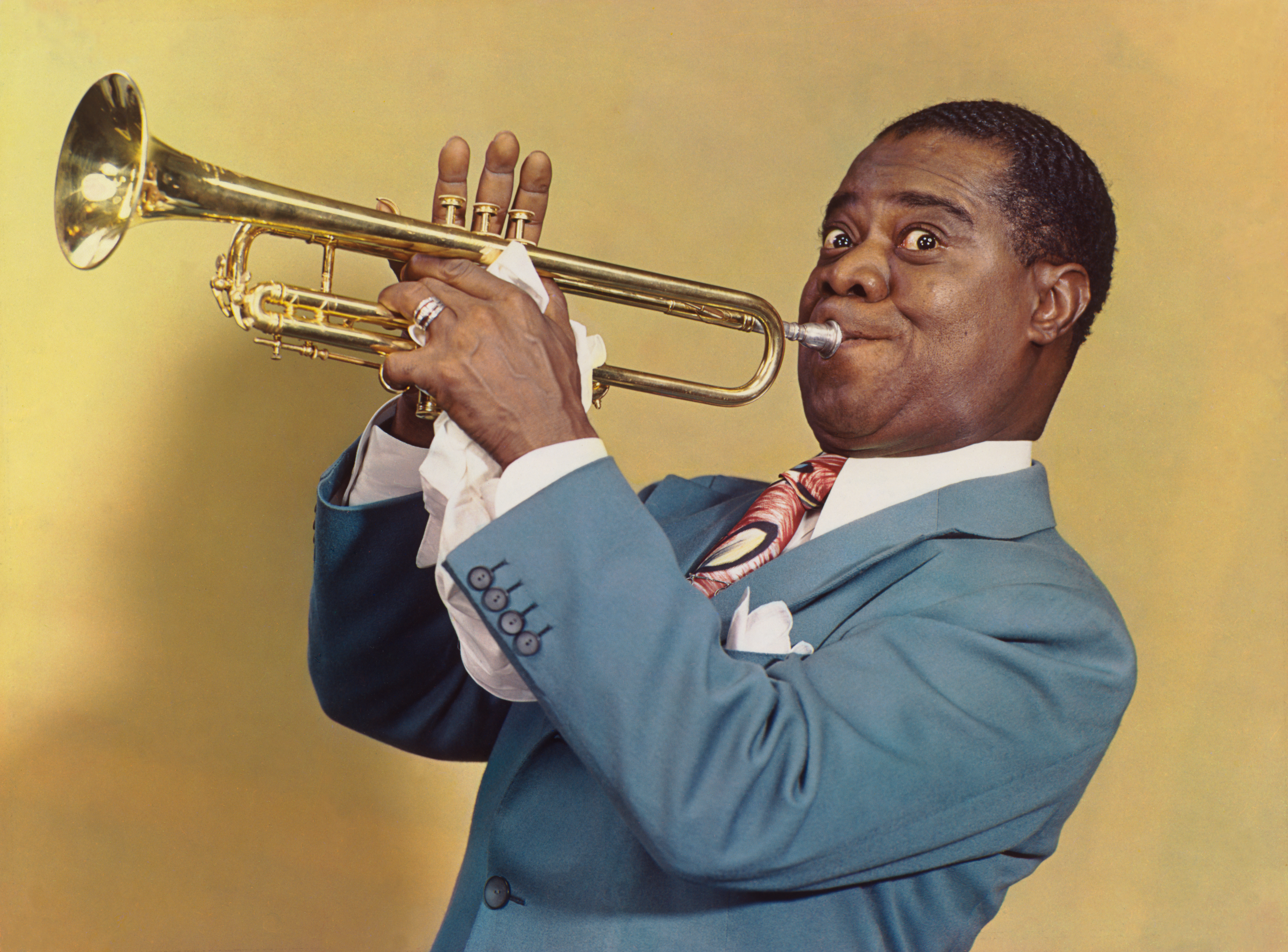
Louis Armstrong

"We used to laugh at Louis Armstrong. We knew he could play the horn, but that didn't save him from our malice and our ridicule. Everywhere we'd look, there would be ol' Louis—sweat poppin', eyes buggin', mouth wide open grinnin' oh my Lord from ear to ear. 'Oofta' we would call it. Moppin' his brow, duckin' his head, doin' his thing for the white man." — Ossie Davis in the 2001 miniseries Jazz

According to Burns, Davis later regretted this sentiment as he came to hold Armstrong in the highest esteem. In the 2014 film Dear White People, one character says another is an "oofta," saying he "modulates his blackness, up or down, depending on the crowd and what he wants from them."

== See also ==
- Culture of Minnesota
- Culture of the Upper Peninsula of Michigan
- Culture of Wisconsin
- List of English words of Norwegian origin
- Oy vey
- ¡Ay, caramba!
- Interjection
