= Morgan Creek Vineyards (Minnesota) =

- Location: New Ulm, Brown County, Minnesota, United States
- Coordinates: 44.2176°N 94.351383°W
- Founded: 1993
- Known for: Ten Thousand Vines, Redtail Ridge
- Distribution: Regional
- Tasting: Open to public
- Website: Official website

Morgan Creek Vineyards is located in New Ulm, Brown County, southern Minnesota.

== Wines ==
It specializes in growing and producing German, American, and French style wines, including Minnesota cold-hardy varietals like the Marquette used in their recent Ten Thousand Vines wine. Ten Thousand Vines was developed with and sold exclusively through Fire Lake Grill in Minneapolis, Minnesota. Morgan Creek offers a variety of award-winning dry to sweet red and white wines made from grapes such as Riesling, Gewurztraminer.

== Winery ==
Morgan Creek boasts Minnesota's only underground winery which helps maintain temperatures ideal for wine production and aging. They offer a tasting room and both indoor and outdoors spaces for events. Morgan Creek Vineyards of Minnesota is an active member of the Minnesota Grape Growers Association, the Biodynamic Farming and Gardening Association and the Land Stewardship Project.

== See also ==
- New Ulm, Minnesota topics
- Wineries in Minnesota
